= Diet (nutrition) =

Sum of food consumed by an organism

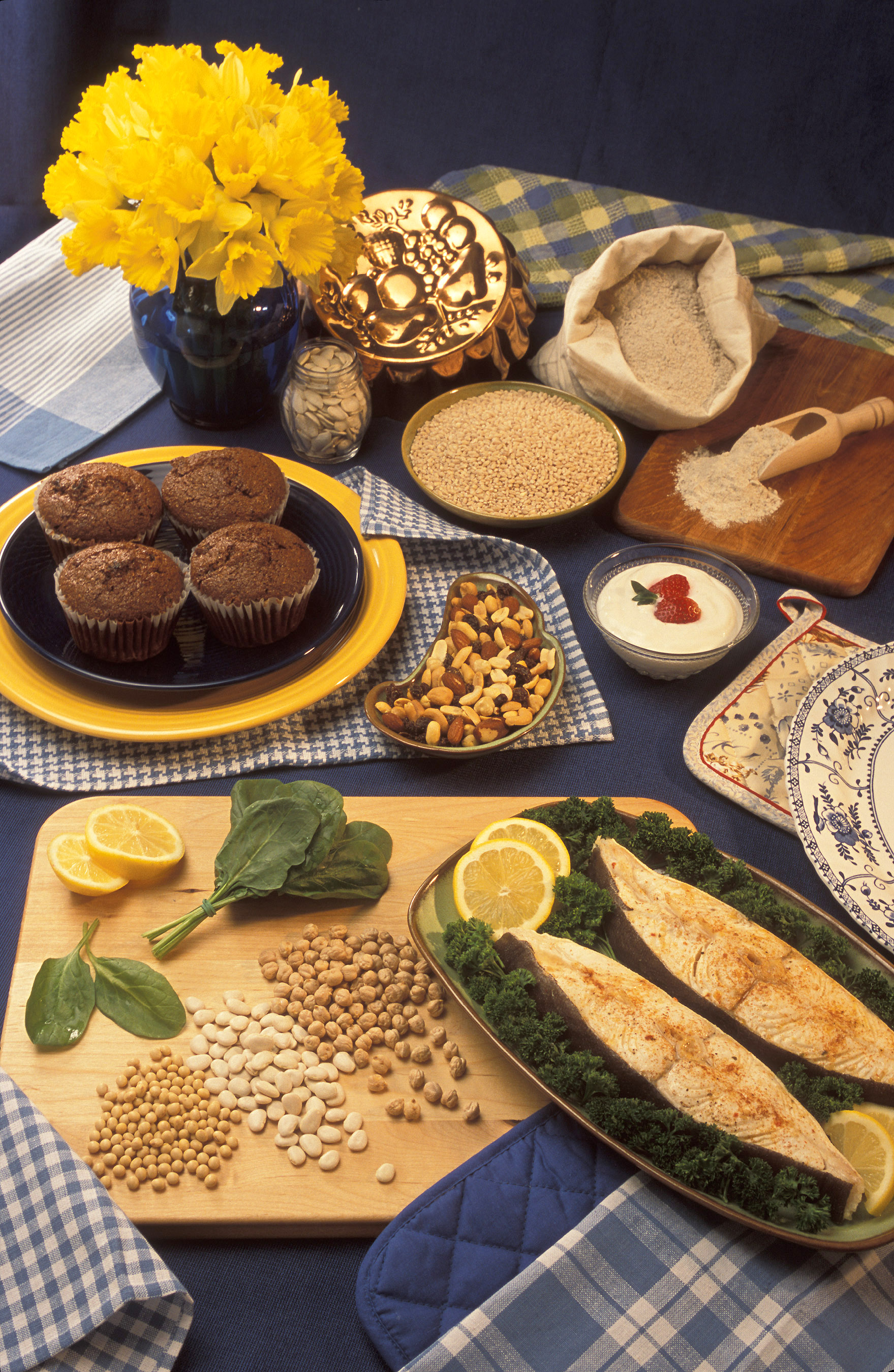
A selection of magnesium-containing food consumed by humans. The human diet can vary widely.

In nutrition, diet is the sum of food consumed by a person or other organism. The word diet often implies the use of specific intake of nutrition for health or weight-management reasons (with the two often being related). Although humans are omnivores, each culture and each person holds some food preferences or some food taboos. This may be due to personal tastes or ethical reasons. Individual dietary choices may be more or less healthy.

Complete nutrition requires ingestion and absorption of vitamins, minerals, essential amino acids from protein and essential fatty acids from fat-containing food, also food energy in the form of carbohydrate, protein, and fat. Dietary habits and choices play a significant role in the quality of life, health and longevity.

== Health ==
A healthy diet can improve and maintain mental and physical health. Specific diets, such as the DASH diet, can be used in treatment and management of chronic conditions.

Dietary recommendations exist for many countries, and they usually emphasise a balanced diet which is culturally appropriate. These recommendations are different from dietary reference values which provide information about the prevention of nutrient deficiencies. In 2025 only 30.8% of children aged 6 to 23 months, and 62.7% of women aged 15 to 49 years, consume a minimally diverse diet.

== Dietary choices ==
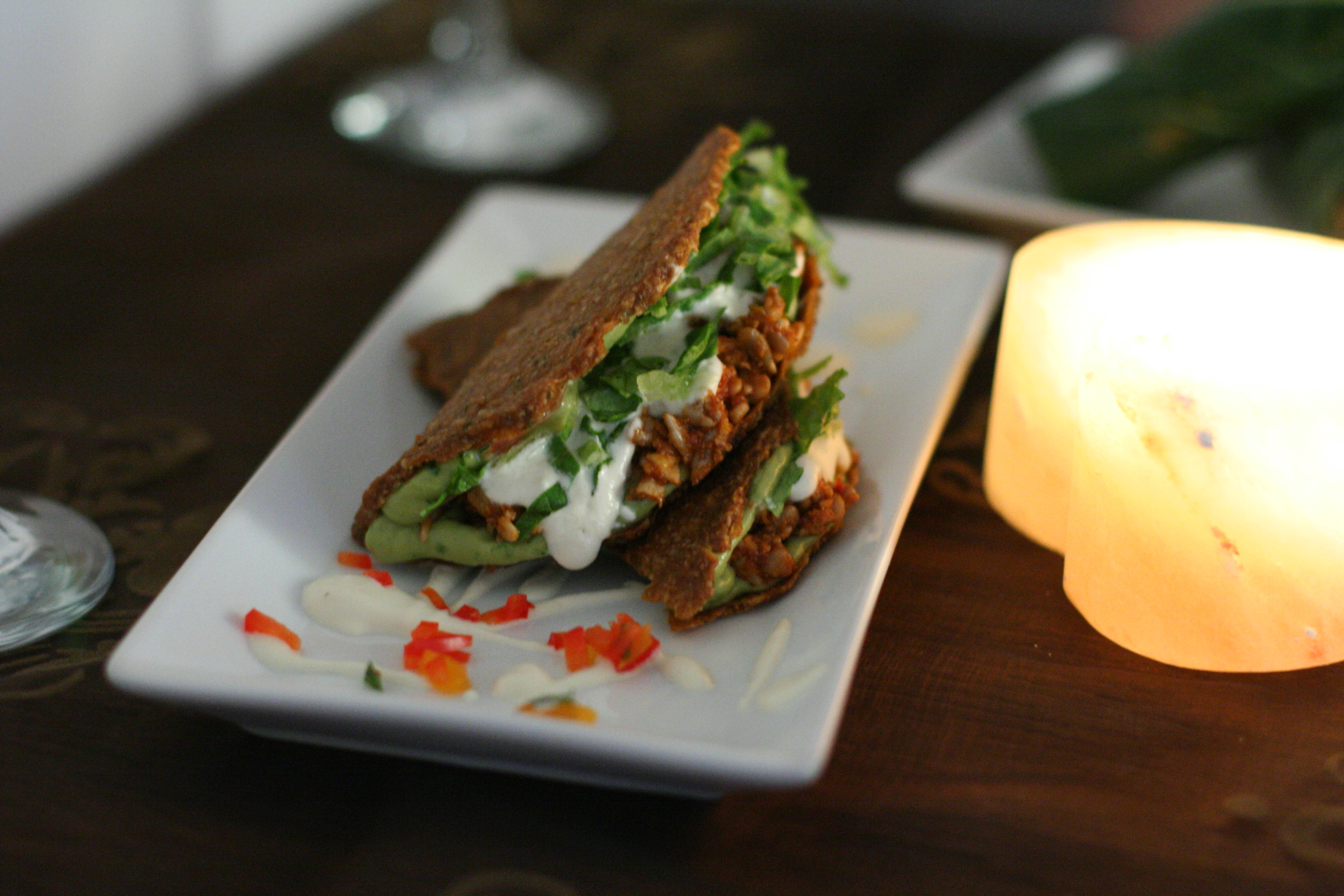
Raw food tacos prepared with guacamole, non-fried beans and sour cream. Raw foodism promotes the consumption of food which has not been cooked.

Exclusionary diets are diets with certain groups or specific types of food avoided, either due to health considerations or by choice. Many do not eat food from animal sources to varying degrees (e.g. flexitarianism, pescetarianism, vegetarianism, and veganism) for health reasons, issues surrounding morality, or to reduce their personal impact on the environment (e.g. environmental vegetarianism). People on a balanced vegetarian or vegan diet can obtain adequate nutrition, but may need to specifically focus on consuming specific nutrients, such as protein, iron, calcium, zinc, and vitamin B_{12}. Raw foodism and intuitive eating are other approaches to dietary choices. Education, income, local availability, and mental health are all major factors for dietary choices.

== Weight management ==
Average dietary energy supply by region

A particular diet may be chosen to promote weight loss or weight gain. Changing a person's dietary intake, or "going on a diet", can change the energy balance, and increase or decrease the amount of fat stored by the body.

The terms "healthy diet" and "diet for weight management" (dieting) are often related, as the two promote healthy weight management. If a person is overweight or obese, changing to a diet and lifestyle that allows them to burn more calories than they consume may improve their overall health, possibly preventing diseases that are attributed in part to weight, including heart disease and diabetes. Within the past 10 years, obesity rates have increased by almost 10%. Conversely, if a person is underweight due to illness or malnutrition, they may change their diet to promote weight gain. Intentional changes in weight, though often beneficial, can be potentially harmful to the body if they occur too rapidly. Unintentional rapid weight change can be caused by the body's reaction to some medications, or may be a sign of major medical problems including thyroid issues and cancer among other diseases.

== Meat consumption ==
Meat commonly refers to red meat from pork, beef, and lamb and to white meat from chicken and turkey. In Western countries, red meat is a significant source of energy and several nutrients such as protein, vitamins, minerals, and fatty acids. Meat can be processed by adding chemical preservatives, smoking, curing, salting, fermenting or canning.

According to the International Agency for Research on Cancer (IARC), processed meat causes cancer, particularly colorectal cancer, and all red meat is a "probable" cause of cancer. Strong evidence also links processed meat with higher risks of cardiovascular disease and type 2 diabetes. The World Cancer Research Fund recommends limiting red meat to no more than three servings per week and minimizing consumption of processed meats.

== Environmental dietary choices ==
Agriculture is a driver of environmental degradation, such as biodiversity loss, climate change, desertification, soil degradation and pollution. The food system as a whole – including refrigeration, food processing, packaging, and transport – accounts for around one-quarter of greenhouse gas emissions. More sustainable dietary choices can be made to reduce the impact of the food system on the environment. These choices may involve reducing consumption of meat and dairy products and instead eating more plant-based foods, and eating foods grown through sustainable farming practices.

== Religious and cultural dietary choices ==
Some cultures and religions have restrictions concerning what foods are acceptable in their diet. For example, only Kosher foods are permitted in Judaism, and Halal foods in Islam. Although Buddhists are generally vegetarians, the practice varies and meat-eating may be permitted depending on the sects. In Hinduism, vegetarianism is the ideal. Jains are strictly vegetarian and in addition to that the consumption of any roots (e.g., potatoes, carrots) is not permitted.

In Christianity there is no restriction on the kinds of animals that can be eaten, though various groups within Christianity have practiced specific dietary restrictions for various reasons. The most common diets consumed by Christians are the Mediterranean diet and vegetarianism. Mediterranean and vegetarian dietary patterns are often linked with balanced nutrition and better health outcomes.

== Diet classification table ==
Food type	Omnivorous	Carnivorous	Pescetarian	Pollotarian	Semi-vegetarian	Vegetarian	Vegan	Fruitarian	Paleo	Ketogenic	Jewish	Islamic	Hindu	Jain
Alcoholic drinks	Yes	No	Yes	Yes	Yes	Yes	Yes	No	No	Maybe	Maybe	No	Maybe	No
Fruit	Yes	No	Yes	Yes	Yes	Yes	Yes	Yes	Yes	No	Yes	Yes	Yes	Maybe
Berries	Yes	No	Yes	Yes	Yes	Yes	Yes	Yes	Yes	Maybe	Yes	Yes	Yes	Yes
Vegetables	Yes	No	Yes	Yes	Yes	Yes	Yes	No (Note: Some plants traditionally considered to be vegetables—such as tomatoes, eggplants, capsicums, and zucchinis—are permitted.)	Yes	Yes	Yes	Yes	Yes	Yes
Greens	Yes	No	Yes	Yes	Yes	Yes	Yes	No	Yes	Yes	Yes	Yes	Yes	Maybe
Legumes	Yes	No	Yes	Yes	Yes	Yes	Yes	Maybe	No	No	Yes	Yes	Yes	Yes
Nuts	Yes	No	Yes	Yes	Yes	Yes	Yes	Maybe	Yes	Maybe	Yes	Yes	Yes	Maybe
Tubers	Yes	No	Yes	Yes	Yes	Yes	Yes	No	Maybe (Note: Typically, potatoes are not permitted but cassava, yams, and sweet potatoes are.)	No	Yes	Yes	Yes	Maybe
Grains	Yes	No	Yes	Yes	Yes	Yes	Yes	Maybe	No	No	Yes	Yes	Yes	Yes
Honey	Yes	No	Yes	Yes	Yes	Yes	No	No	Yes	No	Yes	Yes	Yes	No
Dairy	Yes	Maybe (Note: Some variants of the diet are paleolithic-oriented and exclude dairy while other variants may include dairy products provided that they are ketogenic. Less strict approaches allow all animal sourced foods.)	Maybe	Maybe	Maybe	Maybe (Note: Lacto vegetarians, ovo-lacto vegetarians, and Jain vegetarians permit dairy.)	No	No	No	Maybe	Yes (Note: Dairy is permitted but is not to be cooked or consumed with any meats. Dairy may be prepared and eaten alongside pareve foods.)	Yes	Yes	Yes
Eggs	Yes	Yes	Maybe	Yes	Maybe	Maybe (Note: Both ovo vegetarians and ovo-lacto vegetarians permit eggs.)	No	No	Yes	Yes	Yes	Yes	Maybe	No
Insects	Yes	Yes	No	No	Sometimes	No	No	No	Yes	Yes	No (Note: Locusts are sometimes permitted, depending on the religious denomination.)	No	Maybe	No
Shellfish	Yes	Yes	Yes	No	Sometimes	No	No	No	Yes	Yes	No	Maybe (Note: Mollusks and crustaceans like crab are prohibited according to the Shi'a branch of Islam. The acceptability of shrimp/prawn is debated)	Maybe	No
Fish	Yes	Yes	Yes	No	Sometimes	No	No	No	Yes	Yes	Yes	Yes	Maybe	No
Poultry	Yes	Yes	No	Yes	Sometimes	No	No	No	Yes	Yes	Yes	Yes	Maybe	No
Mutton	Yes	Yes	No	No	Sometimes	No	No	No	Yes	Yes	Yes	Yes	Maybe	No
Venison	Yes	Yes	No	No	Sometimes	No	No	No	Yes	Yes	Yes	Yes	Maybe	No
Pork	Yes	Yes	No	No	Sometimes	No	No	No	Yes	Yes	No	No	Maybe	No
Beef	Yes	Yes	No	No	Sometimes	No	No	No	Yes	Yes	Yes	Yes	No	No

== See also ==
- Dessert crop
- Nutrition psychology

== Sources ==
This article incorporates text from a free content work. Licensed under CC BY 4.0 (license statement/permission). Text taken from The State of Food Security and Nutrition in the World 2026, Food and Agriculture Organization of the United Nations.
