= Vegetarianism by country =

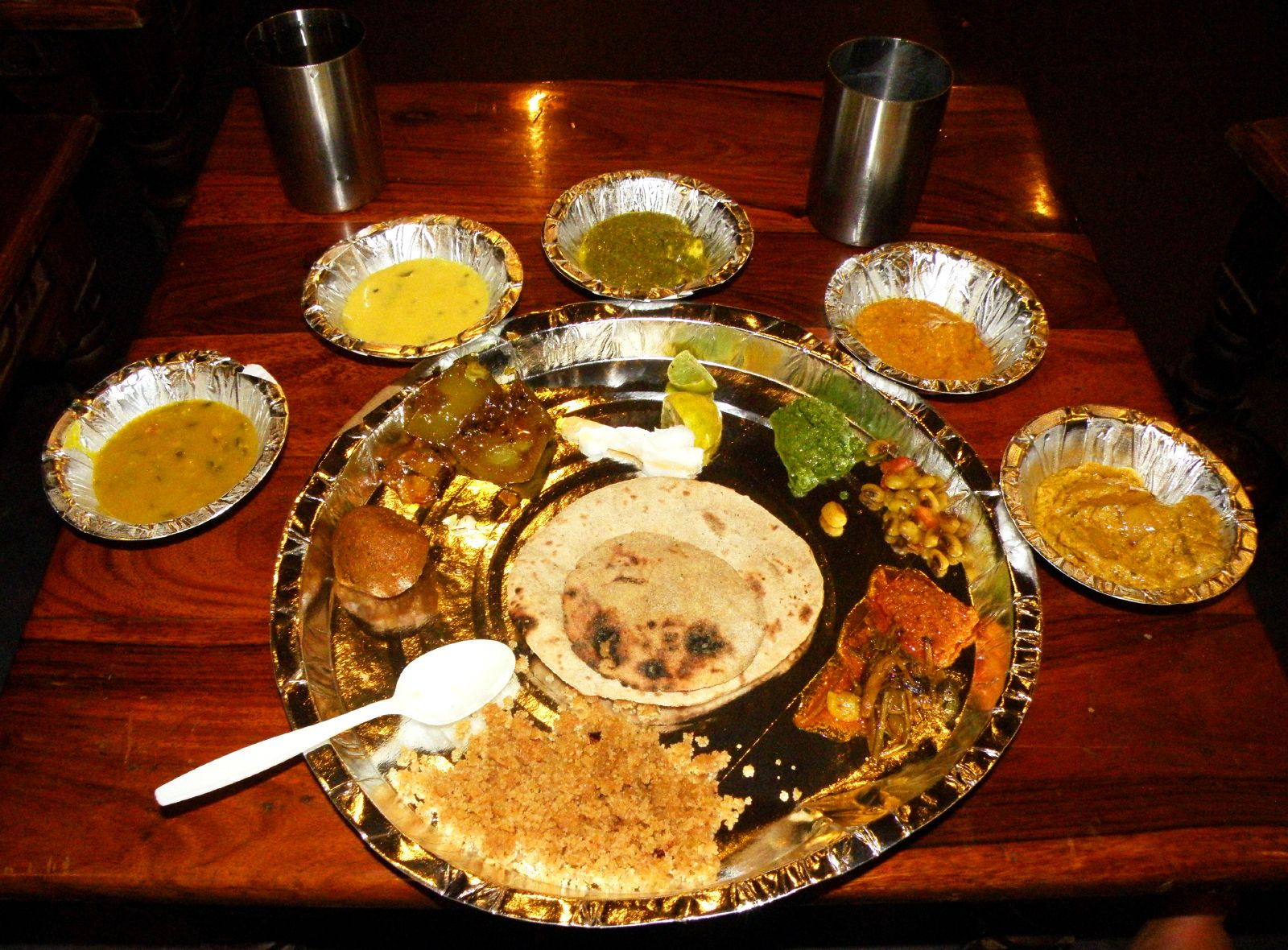
A vegetarian thali from Rajasthan, India. Indian cuisine offers a wide variety of vegetarian delicacies.

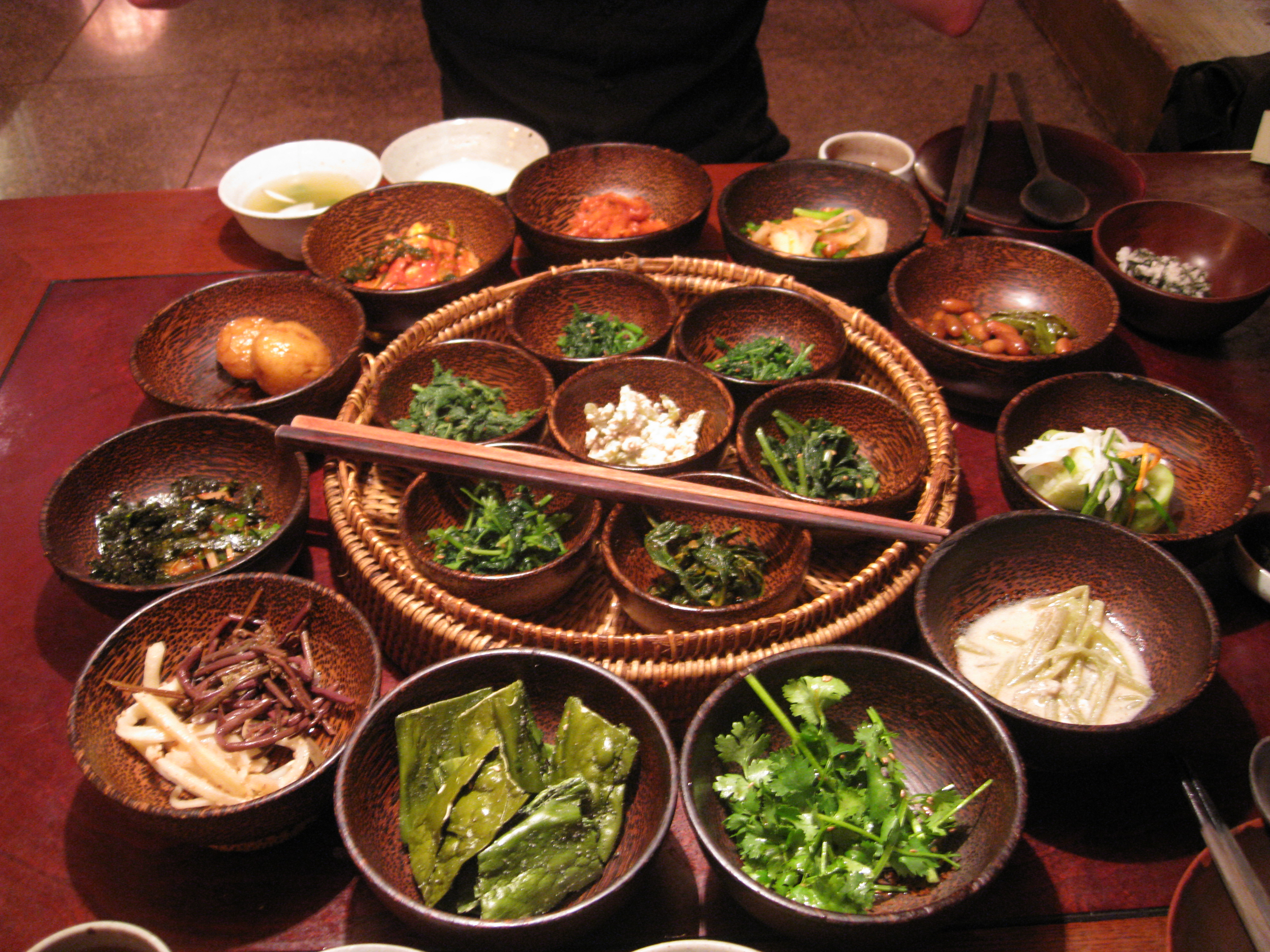
Buddhist-influenced Korean vegetarian side dishes

Vegetarian and vegan dietary practices vary, as does the percentage of vegetarians, among countries. Differences include food standards, laws, and general cultural attitudes toward vegetarian diets. Some countries, such as India, have strong cultural or religious traditions that promote vegetarianism, while other countries have secular ethical concerns, including animal rights, environmental protection, and health concerns.

In general, vegetarians are a minority, except in a small number of exclusively vegetarian cities and towns, such as Rishikesh, which banned the sale of meat, fish, and eggs in 1956, and Palitana, which banned meat sales in 2014, where most or all residents are vegetarians. Some communities are majority vegetarian but meat is sold and consumed in the municipality. Other communities are vegetarian-friendly with a higher than average number of vegetarians but the majority of residents are meat-eaters. In some areas with few or no vegetarians, it may be difficult to find vegetarian food.

In Europe and the United States, some vegetarians, called lacto-ovo vegetarians, eat milk and eggs. However, in India many vegetarians consider eggs to be non-vegetarian and falling in the same category as meat. Some vegetarians that choose to abstain from dairy may be labeled as vegan. However, veganism typically refers to abstaining from any act that may directly or indirectly injure any sentient being, thus typically requiring the exclusion of eggs and honey, along with dairy, as well as further non-dietary exclusions such as the purchase of wool, silk and leather and places where animals are being kept like zoos and circuses. In many countries, food labeling laws make it easier for vegetarians to identify foods compatible with their diets.

The concept of vegetarianism to indicate 'vegetarian diet' is first mentioned by the Greek philosopher and mathematician Pythagoras of Samos around 500 BCE. Followers of several religions such as Buddhism, Hinduism, and Jainism have also advocated vegetarianism, believing that humans should not inflict pain on other animals.

In January 2022, Google stated that searches for "vegan food near me" had dramatically increased in 2021. The term achieved "breakthrough status", meaning it increased by 5,000 percent or more indicating the rising popularity of vegan diets.

== Summary table ==
The percentages in the following table are estimates of vegetarian and vegan prevalence. Definitions and survey methods vary by country and may measure self-identification, dietary behavior, or both; figures are therefore not necessarily directly comparable.

Country	Vegetarians			Vegans		
Country	% of population	Approx. no. of individuals	Year	% of population	Approx. no. of individuals	Year
Argentina	12%	5,400,000	2020			
Australia	5.3%	2,500,000	2023	2%	518,000	2020
Austria	11%	993,000	2022	2%	180,000	2022
Belgium	7%	800,000	2018	1%	110,000	2018
Brazil	14% (Note: In the survey, 8% of respondents aged 16 or older totally agreed and 6% partially agreed with the statement "I am vegetarian".)	22,000,000	2018	7%	15,000,000	2025
Canada	7.6%	2,888,000	2020	4.6%	1,768,000	2020
Chile	6%–14%	2,500,000	2018-2020	4%	750,000	2020
China	16%	168,000,000	2019	2%	28,000,000	2019
Colombia	4%	2,000,000	2016	2%	1,000,000	2016
Czech Republic	5%	500,000	2019	1%	100,000	2019
Denmark	3%	180,000	2024-2025	1%	250,000	2024-2025
Estonia	5%	53,200	2020	1%	13,300	2020
Finland	11%	448,000	2024	3%	168,000	2024
France	0.8%	375,000	2021	0.3%	115,000	2021
Germany	8%	6,600,000	2024	2%	1,690,000	2024
Greece	4%	400,000	2022	2%	200,000	2022
Hungary	5%	450,000	2022	1%	90,000	2022
India	39%	470,000,000	2019–2020 2021	9%	121,500,000	2021
Indonesia	11%	30,000,000	2022			
Ireland	4.3–8.4%	153,500	2018	2.0%–4.1%	146,500	2018
Israel	8%	640,622	2015	5%	400,389	2015
Italy	9.5%	5,600,000	2024	2.3%	1,300,000	2024
Jamaica	10% (Note: Most of these vegetarians are Rastafarians.)	280,000	2015			
Japan	4%	1,675,000	2018	2.7%	3,500,000	2016
Latvia	4%	57,000	2020	1%	19,000	2020
Lithuania	4%	84,300	2020	1%	28,100	2020
Malaysia	5%	1,638,600	2019			
Mexico	19%	23,750,000	2016	9%	11,250,000	2016
Netherlands	4.5%	850,000	2025	0.7%	125,000	2025
New Zealand	2%	100,000	2018-2020	0.7%	50,000	2018-2020
Norway	8%	215,000	2020	4%	215,000	2020
Philippines	5%	5,000,000	2014	2%	2,000,000	2014
Poland	6.6%	2,500,000	2017	1.8%	536,000	2017
Portugal	1.4%	140,000	2023	0.4%	60,000	2023
Romania	4%		2024	2%		2024
Russia	1%	1,450,000	2023			
Singapore	5% (Note: Includes vegans)	380,000	2023			
Slovenia	1.5%-2.3%	50.000	2011	0.4%-0.6%	50,000	2011
South Korea	3%	1,500,000	2017			
Spain	1.7%	700,000	2023	0.7%	380,000	2023
Sweden	10%	621,000	2020	4%	414,000	2020
Switzerland	5.3%	308,000	2024	0.7%	50,000	2024
Taiwan	13–14%	3,297,011	2015; 2016; 2017; 2019			
Thailand	8.0%	5,400,000	2019			
Ukraine	5.2%	2,000,000	2017			
United Kingdom	5%	3,464,000	2025	2%	1,386,000	2025
United States	4.2%	14,000,000	2023	1.5%	5,000,000	2023
Vietnam	10%	9,000,000	2011			

== Africa ==
According to a 2016 survey, the Africa/Middle East region (of which Egypt, Morocco, Saudi Arabia, South Africa and the United Arab Emirates were surveyed) has 16% vegetarians and 6% vegans.

=== East Africa ===
Vegan dishes are commonplace in Ethiopian cuisine due to mandates by the Ethiopian Orthodox Church and Egyptian Coptic Christianity that require weekly fasting (abstaining from all meat products).

As the majority of the population of Mauritius is Hindu, vegetarianism is common and vegetarian cuisine is widely available in restaurants.

=== North Africa ===
Countries in North Africa have a tradition of cooking in a vegetarian style, with Morocco, Algeria, Libya and Tunisia being particularly connected with this type of cooking which includes couscous and spiced vegetables.

=== Southern Africa ===
Hindu and Jain immigrants from India brought vegetarianism with them. This trend has been documented as far back as 1895 in Natal Province.

== Asia ==
Of five world regions, the Asia–Pacific region has the highest share of vegetarians (19%) and vegans (9%).

=== East Asia ===
==== China ====
An estimated 4–5% of people in China are vegetarian, with that number growing particularly in urban areas. Tofu, soy milk, and seitan, which are popular among vegetarians around the world, originated in China.

Classical Chinese texts pointed to a period of abstinence from meat before undertaking matters of great importance or of religious significance. People typically abstain from meat periodically, particularly on the eve of Chinese New Year. Although it is more common among adherents of Chinese folk religion, many secular people also do this. Chinese folk religion is similar to Shinto in Japan, as while the killing and eating of animals is not forbidden, it is considered impure and not ideal.

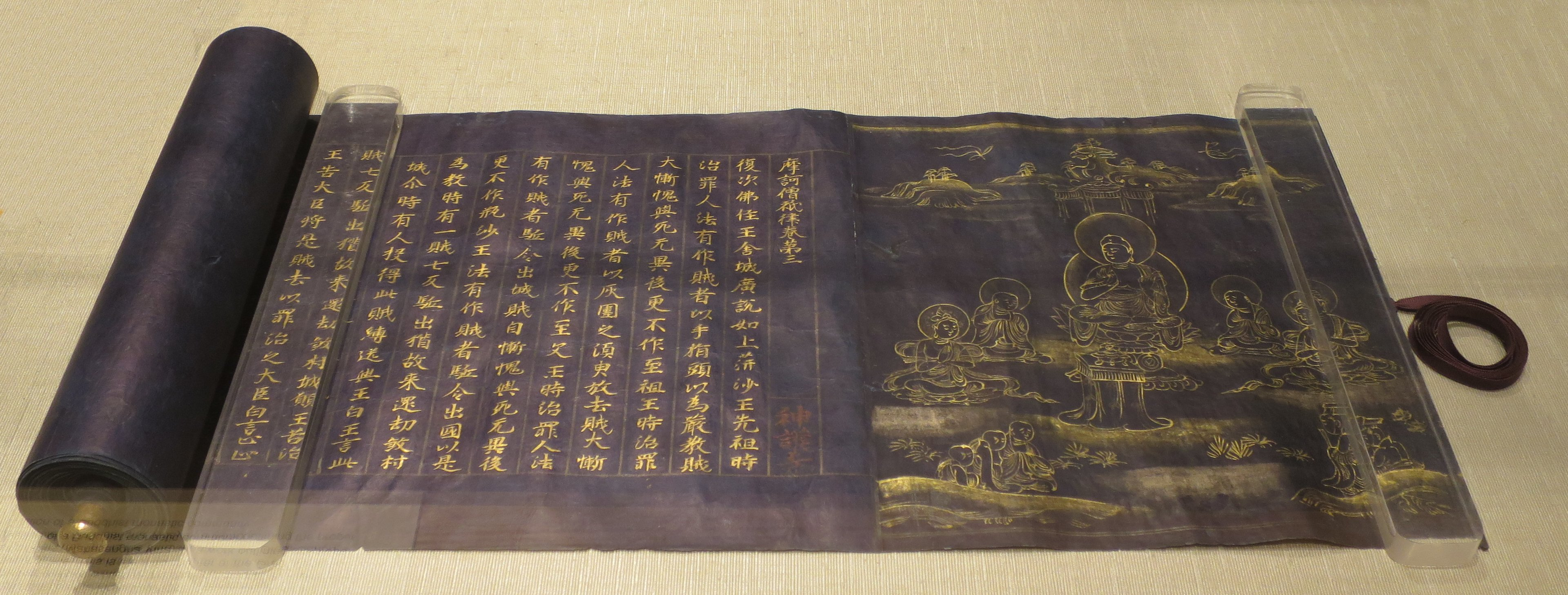
Vinaya which mentions the importance of veganism

Ancient China was once known for having profound veganism in its food culture. Its widespread vegetarianism originally comes from the Buddhist code (Vinaya) transferred from ancient India which valued not killing animals. With the influx of Buddhist influences, vegetarianism became more popular, though there is a difference between Buddhist vegetarianism and Taoist vegetarianism. Taoist vegetarianism is based on a perception of purity, while Buddhist vegetarianism is based on the dual basis of refraining from killing and of subduing one's own subservience to the senses. Because of this, two types of vegetarianism emerged—one where the practitioner refrained from eating meat, and the in which the practitioner refrained from eating meat as well as garlic, onions, and other such strongly flavored foods. This Buddhism-influenced vegetarianism has been known and practiced by some since at least the 7th century. People who are Buddhist may also avoid eating eggs.

The early 20th century saw some intellectuals espousing vegetarianism as part of their program for reforming China culturally, not just politically. The anarchist thinker Li Shizeng, for instance, argued that tofu and soy products were healthier and could be a profitable export. Liang Shuming, a philosopher and reform activist, adopted a basically vegetarian diet, but did not promote it for others.

==== Japan ====
In Japan, it was considered normal to have meat in daily diet. But after Buddhism arrived to the country, the emperor at that time made a law in 675 CE to restrict people from eating cows, horses, dogs, monkeys and chickens. This change is assumed to be a contributor to the spread of 精進料理 (shōjin ryōri), a type of meals that is still eaten at contemporary Buddhist temples.

Even though shōjin ryōri is often assumed to be the same as vegetarian, it has its roots in religion, and the word shōjin ryōri refers to the different ways of cooking and table manners that differ by religious branches, not only it being vegetarian meals. Some of the differences between vegetarian foods and shōjin ryōri is that the usage of onions, garlics, or herbs and vegetables that have strong smells is avoided in addition to the avoidance of meat, and this is because consumption of those foods is believed to prevent one from focusing in Buddhist practices.

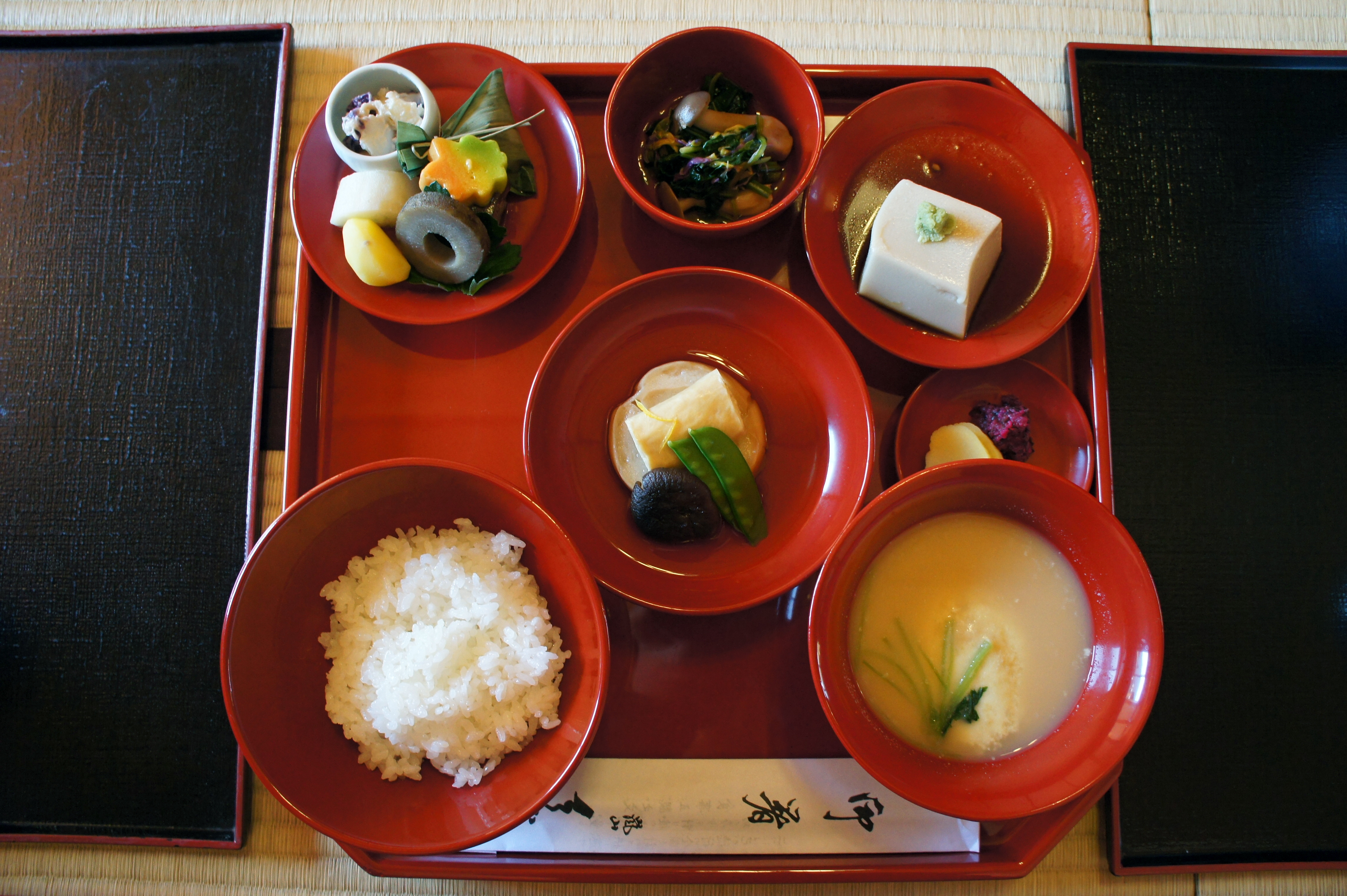
shōjin ryōri served in a temple in Kyoto

==== South Korea ====
According to The Food and Beverage News, vegetarianism grew from over 7,000 in 2015 to nearly 30,000 in 2019, and many converted for health reasons. Some of the popular reasons for changing their diet are ethical concerns, environmental protection concerns, and to lose weight.

A study by the Korean Agro-Fisheries and Food Trade Corporation found that from a study of 5,510 respondents, 418 people followed a diet that refrained from eating meat. From the statistic, 79.7% of them identified as flexitarians (those who eat meat rarely), 11% of them identified as pollotarians and pescatarians (those who still eat poultry but no other meats, and those who still eat fish but no meats), and 6% of them are vegetarians.

With Beyond Meat and other plant-based meat alternatives hitting the shelves of the world, Lotte Mart, a Korean grocery store, noticed the growth in the popularity of meat alternatives. They then produced an alternative to meat called Gogi Daesin, which translates to "instead of meat."

==== Taiwan ====
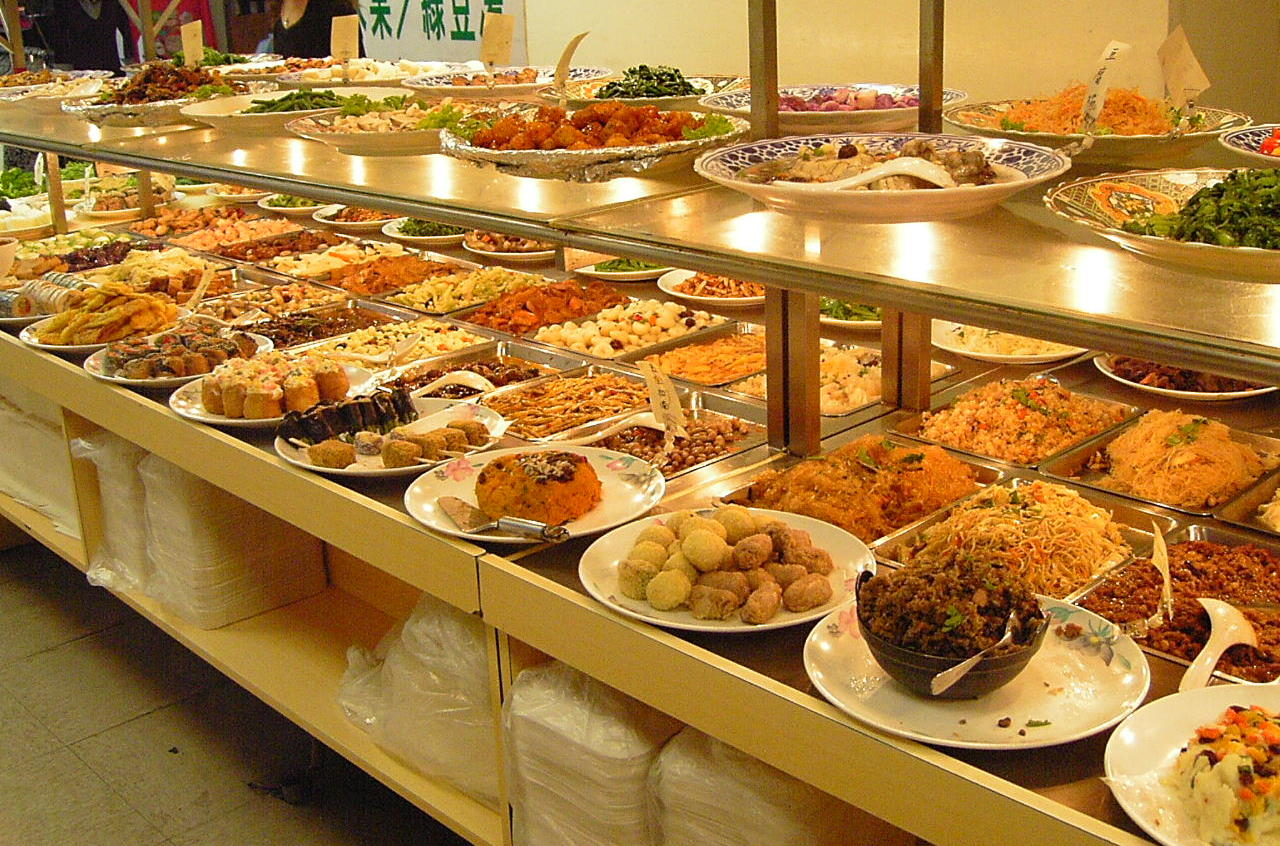
A vegetarian buffet restaurant in Taipei, Taiwan

There are more than 6,000 vegetarian eating establishments in Taiwan. The country's food labelling laws for vegetarian food are the world's strictest, because it has been estimated that more than 3 million Taiwanese people eat vegetarian food, which accounts for approximately 13% of the national population. A popular movement of "one day vegetarian every week" has been advocated on a national level. Also, on a local level, even government bodies are involved, such as the Taipei City Board of Education. Vegetarian food can be found in meals served on the Taiwan High Speed Rail, Taiwan Railways Administration, major Taiwanese airlines, as well as highway stops.

=== South Asia ===
==== India ====
Vegetarianism in ancient India
Throughout the whole country the people do not kill any living creature, nor drink intoxicating liquor, nor eat onions or garlic. The only exception is that of the Chandalas. That is the name for those who are (held to be) wicked men, and live apart from others. ... In that country they do not keep pigs and fowls, and do not sell live cattle; in the markets there are no butchers' shops and no dealers in intoxicating drink. In buying and selling commodities they use cowries. Only the Chandalas are fishermen and hunters, and sell flesh meat.

— Faxian, Chinese pilgrim to India (4th/5th century CE), A Record of Buddhistic Kingdoms (translated by James Legge)

===== All-vegetarian locations =====
A small number of religious centers in India have banned all meat sales within municipal boundaries. Since 1956, Rishikesh has banned meat, fish, and eggs. In 2014, Palitana banned meat sales. All vegetarian locations in India are:

- Haridwar in Uttarakhand, India
- Palitana in Gujarat, India
- Pushkar in Rajasthan, India
- Rishikesh in Uttarakhand, India
- Tirumala in Andhra Pradesh, India
- Mayapur in West Bengal

===== Prevalence of vegetarianism =====
Vegetarian mark: Mandatory labeling in India to distinguish vegetarian products from non-vegetarian products

In 2007, UN FAO statistics indicated that Indians had the lowest rate of meat consumption in the world. Some vegetarians in India have been demanding meat-free supermarkets. In Indian cuisine, vegetarianism is usually synonymous with lacto vegetarianism. Most restaurants in India clearly distinguish themselves as being either "non-vegetarian", "vegetarian", or "pure vegetarian" or "Jain vegetarian" depending upon location, chef/staff, ingredients used and items served. With non-vegetarian and vegetarian being self-explanatory, pure vegetarian refers to hotels run by vegetarian staff, owners subscribing to lacto-vegetarianism including avoidance of indirect animal ingredients like rennet, collagen while Jain vegetarian refers to food subscribing to Jain standards. Some restaurants cater to Eggetarians who are lacto-ovo-vegetarians. Vegetarian restaurants abound, and many vegetarian options are usually available.

Animal-based ingredients (other than milk and honey) such as lard, gelatin, and meat stock are not used in their traditional cuisine. India has devised a system of marking edible products made from only vegetarian ingredients, with a green dot in a square with a green outline. A new mark of a red triangle in a square with a red outline conveys that some animal-based ingredients (meat, egg, etc.) were used, since 2021. Earlier a mark of a red circle in a square with a red outline used to be used. This was replaced due to issues faced by people with colour blindness in distinguishing between the marks. Products like honey, milk, or its direct derivatives are categorized under the green mark.

It is noted that, in states where vegetarianism is more common, milk consumption is higher and is associated with lactase persistence. This allows people to continue consuming milk into adulthood and obtain proteins that are substituted for meat, fish and eggs in other areas.

Connection of vegetarianism and Hinduism

Vegetarianism and Hinduism share a deep connection with each other. Hinduism believes that the soul has no beginning and an end, but it is a perpetual cycle through endless rebirth and deaths until the soul can reach the Brahman, God. However, only people can attain this status who disconnect from any worldly objects and become free of all cravings and desires and because of concept of necessary violence ( which is needed in emergency like self defence ) and unnecessary violence ( which can be avoided ) in Hinduism, many see Non-vegetarianism as unnecessary violence, hence avoid it. From this aspect of Hinduism, vegetarianism was naturally and smoothly rooted in the cultural cuisine and modest vegetarian diet in India.

A non-vegetarian Biriyani Restaurant in Mysore

Kamat Upachar, a vegetarian chain restaurant, in Bangalore

In India, most restaurants publicly and explicitly display the title 'pure-vegetarian' or 'non-vegetarian' or corresponding symbols on ad boards. This practice is intended to help strict, orthodox vegetarians who may want to avoid eating in such restaurants due to religious and casteist reasons or due to consciousness of the pain and sufferings that are inflicted on animals.

===== Estimates and statistics =====
====== CNN-IBN State of the Nation Survey, 2008 ======
According to a 2006 Hindu-CNN-IBN State of the Nation Survey, 31% of Indians are vegetarian, while another 9% also consume eggs (ovo-vegetarian). Among the various communities, vegetarianism was most common among the Bishnoi community which is 100% pure vegetarian, Swaminarayan community, Brahmins, Arya Samaj community, Lingayats, Vaishnavites, Jains, mostly Jats, Sikhs and, less frequent among Muslims (3%) and residents of coastal states. However, other surveys cited by FAO and USDA estimate 40% of the Indian population as being vegetarian. These surveys indicate that even Indians who do eat meat, do so infrequently, with less than 30% consuming it regularly, although the reasons are mainly cultural.

====== Economic and Political Weekly, 2018 ======
A 2018 study from Economic and Political Weekly by US-based anthropologist Balmurli Natrajan and India-based economist Suraj Jacob suggests that these numbers could be inflated by social reluctance to admit to meat consumption and estimates that the percentage of vegetarians is likely closer to 20% than 30% overall, with the percentage varying by household income and caste. The study argues that meat-eating behavior is underreported because consumption of meat, especially beef, is "caught in cultural, political, and group identity struggles in India".

According to a 2018 survey released by the registrar general of India, Rajasthan (74.9%), Haryana (69.25%), Punjab (66.75%), and Gujarat (60.95%) have the highest percentage of vegetarians, followed by Madhya Pradesh (50.6%), Uttar Pradesh (47.1%), Maharashtra (40.2%), Delhi (39.5%), Uttarakhand (27.35%), Karnataka (21.1%), Assam (20.6%), Chhattisgarh (17.95%), Bihar (7.55%), Jharkhand (3.25%), Kerala (3.0%), Odisha (2.65%), Tamil Nadu (2.35%), Andhra Pradesh (1.75%), West Bengal (1.4%), and Telangana (1.3%).

====== Various studies conducted by the Government of India ======
An official survey conducted by the Government of India, with a sample size of 8858 and the census frame as 2011, indicated India's vegetarian population to be 28–29% of the total population. Compared to a similar survey done in 2004, India's vegetarian population has increased, although according to conflicting data from the National Family Health Survey in 2015–2016 (NFHS), the share of vegetarianism has declined compared to data from 2005 to 2006. Increases in meat consumption in India have been attributed to urbanisation, increasing disposable income, consumerism and cross-cultural influences.

In 2022, the National Health and Family Survey (NHFS) released its fifth survey results (2019–2021) which reiterated the hypothesis of a sizeable section of nutrition scholars that the number of Indians who are non-vegetarian has been increasing steadily. It also found significant gender disparities in the consumption of solely vegetarian food.

====== Pew Research Center, 2021 ======
In 2021, Pew Research Center released the results of a survey of over 29,999 Indians throughout the country which included questions on dietary preferences. According to this study, around 39% of the overall Indian population identifies as vegetarian (the survey did not specify a type of vegetarianism and left the definition of the term up to the respondent). In terms of religion, Jains were found to be the most vegetarian at 92%, followed by Sikhs (59%), Hindus (44%), Buddhists (25%), Christians (10%), and finally Muslims (8%). Among Hindus, however, there are wide regional variations with regard to the percentage of people identifying as vegetarian, with 71% of North Indian Hindus identifying as vegetarian, followed by 61% of Central Indians, 57% of West Indians, 30% of South Indians, 19% of Northeast Indians, and 18% of East Indians identifying as vegetarian. There are also caste differences in rates of vegetarianism, with 40% of lower caste Hindus identifying as vegetarian compared to 53% for general category Hindus. Hindus who considered religion very important in their lives identified as vegetarian 46% of the time compared to 33% for those who said it was less important.

=== Southeast Asia ===
==== Malaysia ====
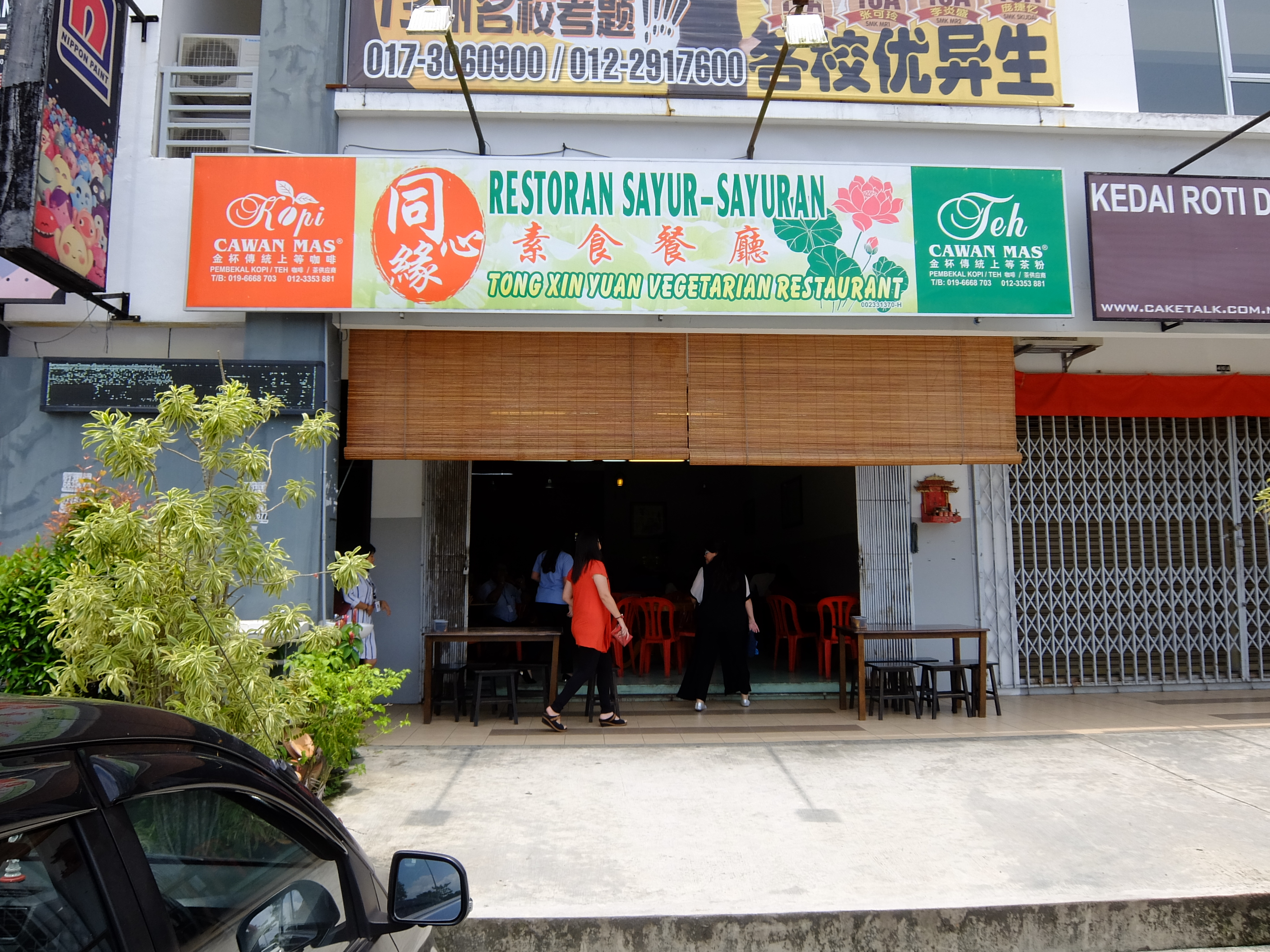
A vegetarian restaurant in Johor, Malaysia

Vegetarian diets are categorized as lacto vegetarianism, ovo-lacto vegetarianism, and veganism in general. The reasons for being vegetarian include influence from friends and family members, concern about global warming, health issues and weight management, religion and mercy for animals, in descending order of significance.

==== Indonesia ====
Vegetarianism and veganism have grown in Indonesia alongside increased interest in health and plant-based foods. A 2022 review published in Heliyon estimated that around two million Indonesians were vegetarian or vegan and noted that the number of people registered with the Indonesia Vegetarian Society increased from about 60,000 in 2007 to 500,000 in 2010. The review attributed some of the growth in vegetarianism to health awareness and the influence of Buddhist and Hindu communities, while also noting that rising incomes have contributed to increased meat consumption.

In an online survey of 2,378 Indonesian respondents conducted by Snapcart in November 2022, 11% identified as vegetarian or vegan. Among respondents who had not previously followed either diet, 45% expressed an interest in trying one, while health and longevity were the most frequently cited motivations among those who had tried vegetarian or vegan diets.

==== Singapore ====
Rice, mushrooms, vegetables are some of the dietary staples, mixed with a rich variety of spices, coconut, lime and tamarind. Buddhist Chinese monastics are vegetarians or vegans. Singapore is also the headquarters of the world's first international, vegetarian, fast food chain, VeganBurg. The bigger communities of vegetarians and vegans in Singapore are Vegetarian Society (VSS) and SgVeganCommunity. Vegetarian and vegan places have an active role in the gastronomy of Singapore.

==== Thailand ====
There are more than 908 vegetarian eating establishments in Thailand.

=== West Asia ===
==== Israel ====
A study by the Israeli Ministry of Health in 2001 found that 7.2% of men and 9.8% of women were vegetarian. Although vegetarianism is quite common, the actual percentage of vegetarians in Israel may be lower—the Israeli food industry estimated it at 5%. In 2010, one study found that 2.6% of Israelis were vegetarians or vegans.

According to a 2015 poll done by two Israeli newspapers Globes and Channel 2, 8% of the Israeli population were vegetarians and 5% were vegans. 13% consider turning vegan or vegetarian. Tel Aviv beat out Berlin, New York and Chennai as U.S. food website The Daily Meal's top destination for vegan travelers.

Jewish vegan and vegetarian population has contributed to promotion of meat-free and animal-product-free cultures within Israel through various platforms. The Israeli army made special provision for vegan soldiers in 2015, which included providing non-leather boots and wool-free berets.

Some argue that the practicing and learning Judaism would lead a person to adopt vegetarianism or veganism.

== Europe ==
The definition of vegetarianism throughout Europe is not uniform, creating the potential for products to be labelled inaccurately. Throughout Europe the use of non-vegetarian ingredients are found in products such as beer (isinglass among others), wine (gelatine and crustacean shells among others) and cheese (rennet).

=== Belgium ===
Since May 2009, Belgium has had the first city in the world (Ghent) with a weekly "veggie day".

A study that surveyed 2,436 Belgian individuals found that "21.8% of the respondents believed that meat consumption is unhealthy, and 45.6% of the respondents believed that they should eat less meat." The major reasons persons expressed interest in a more plant-based diet was for taste and health-related reasons. The majority of vegetarians polled think that the meat industry is harmful to the planet, while more than half of the non-vegetarians surveyed disagree with this statement.

=== Finland ===
In some cities' schools in Finland, the students are offered two options, a vegetarian and a non-vegetarian meal, on four school days a week, and one day a week they have a choice between two vegetarian meals, for grades 1 to 12. In secondary schools and universities, from 10 to 40 percent of the students preferred vegetarian food in 2013. Vegetarianism is most popular in secondary art schools where in some schools over half of the students were vegetarians in 2013.

=== France ===
In France, lunches at public schools must contain a "minimum of 20% of meals containing meat and 20% containing fish, and the remainder containing egg, cheese, or offal. However, under a law called "loi Egalim", which passed in 2018 and came into effect in November 2019, all French schools are required to serve at least one meat-free meal a week. In September 2020, 73% of French nurseries and elementary schools offer at least one meat-free meal a week, according to a recent investigation by Greenpeace.

An Appetite study found that French women were more accepting of vegetarianism than French men.

There has been conflict between vegans and farmers in southern France. A farmers' union known as "Coordination Rurale" advocated for the French to continue eating meat through the slogan "To save a peasant farmer, eat a vegan."

==== All-vegetarian location ====
France is home to one all-vegetarian location, Community of the Ark in La Borie Noble.

=== Germany ===
In 1889, the first "International Veg Congress" met in Cologne, Germany.

In 2016, Germany was found to have the highest percentage of vegetarians (7.8 million, 10%) and vegans (900,000, 1.1%) in the modern West. A survey from Forsa also revealed that approximately 42 million people in Germany identify as flexitarians aka "part time vegetarians". Professionals at the German Official Agencies estimate that by 2020 over 20% of Germans will eat mostly vegetarian. The reason vegetarianism is so prevalent in Germany is not agreed upon, but the movement seems to have experienced much growth from promotion in media and the offering of more non-meat options.

According to the Federal Ministry of Agriculture, Food and Regional Identity's 2024 Nutrition Report, 8% of survey respondents said they are vegetarian, and 2% vegan. These figures were unchanged from 2023.

=== Hungary ===
The recorded history of vegetarianism in the country began with the Hungarian Vegetarian Society (HVS), formed in 1883. During this time, vegetarianism was popular because New Age ideas and counter belief systems were favored. In 1911, the first Hungarian vegetarian restaurant opened up in Vámház körút. In the 1950s, the HVS ceased operations and vegetarianism in popular culture diminished. Hungarian vegetarianism was later revived in 1989 with the fall of socialism. The "Ahimsa Hungarian Vegetarian Society of Veszprém" was founded in the late 90s.

=== Iceland ===
According to Iceland Monitor in 2016, Iceland had more vegetarian restaurants registered on HappyCow per capita than any other country in Europe.

=== Ireland ===
While meat and dairy products have traditionally featured prominently in the Irish diet, vegetarianism and veganism have experienced rapid growth in recent decades. In 2018, a study by Bord Bia, a state agency which seeks to support and promote the country's agriculture industry, found that as many as 5.1% of the Irish population are now vegetarian, and up to 3.5% are vegan. A further 10% were described as some form of flexitarian, meaning that they still consumed some meat and dairy products but sought to minimize the amount of animal products in their diet. Participants identified a range of motivators for their dietary choices, but personal health and wellness and environmental concerns were among the most common factors cited.

=== Netherlands ===
It was reported in 2006 that sales of meat substitutes had an annual growth of around 25%, which made it one of the fastest-growing markets in the Netherlands. In supermarkets and stores, it is sometimes necessary to read the fine print on products in order to make sure that there are no animal-originated ingredients. Increasingly, however, vegetarian products are labeled with the international "V-label", overseen by the Dutch Vegetarian Society.

In a late 2019 study published by the environmental organization Stichting Natuur en Milieu ("Stichting Nature and Environment"), 59% of Dutch adults (age 16 and up) described themselves as a "meat eater" while 37% responded that they were flexitarians. 43% of respondents claimed that they ate less meat than they did four years earlier. Furthermore, almost half (47%) agreed with or agreed strongly with the statement that eating meat is an outdated practice. In their surveys, 2% identified as vegetarian, 2% as pescetarian and <1% as vegan.

In a March 2020 factsheet published by the Nederlandse Vegetariërsbond ("Dutch Union of Vegetarians"), calculations were made to document the different types of vegetarians. 4–6% of Dutch people (an average of about 860,000) reported they never ate meat. Of this number, 2% called themselves "vegetarian" while some 1% labeled themselves as vegan. The remaining 1–3% was pescetarian.

In July 2020 the Nederlandse Vereniging voor Veganisme estimated the number of vegans in the Netherlands at 150,000. That is approximately 0.9% of the Dutch population.

=== Poland ===
The capital of Poland, Warsaw, was listed 6th on the list of Top Vegan Cities in the World published by HappyCow in 2019.

=== Portugal ===
In 2007, the number of vegetarians in Portugal was estimated at 30,000; which is equal to less than 0.3% of the population. In 2014, the number was estimated to be 200,000 people. Vegan and vegetarian products like soy milk, soy yogurts, rice milk and tofu are widely available in major retailers, and sold across the country. According to HappyCow, Lisbon is the 6th city in the world for number of vegan restaurants per capita, more than any other European city.

=== Romania ===
Followers of the Romanian Orthodox Church keep fasts during several periods in the ecclesiastical calendar amounting to a majority of the year. In the Romanian Orthodox tradition, devotees keep to a diet without any animal products during these times. As a result, vegan foods are abundant in stores and restaurants; however, Romanians may not be familiar with a vegan or vegetarian diet as a full-time lifestyle choice.

=== Russia ===
Vegetarianism in Russia first gained prominence in 1901 with the opening of the St. Petersburg Vegetarian Society. Vegetarianism began to largely grow after the collapse of the Soviet Union in 1991, and has been found to be mainly among the wealthy and educated.

==== All-vegetarian location ====
Russia is home to one all-vegetarian location, Cheremshanka, Altai Republic.

=== Spain ===
The number of restaurants and food stores catering exclusively, or partially, to vegetarians and vegans has more than doubled since 2011; with a total of 800 on record by the end of 2016, The Green Revolution claims.

=== Sweden ===
Surveys show that the percentage of Swedes who state that they are vegetarians or vegans is around 10% and that this figure has increased significantly since 2010. According to a survey conducted by Demoskop on behalf of the Swedish animal rights organisation Djurens rätt in 2014, the percentage of vegetarians was 6%, and the percentage of vegans 4%. The same figures were reported in a survey by Ipsos in 2020 on behalf of the Finnish branch of the Norwegian food company Orkla. That survey also showed that the percentage of Swedes who state that they only eat meat occasionally, sometimes called flexitarians, is 17%, which is much higher than in the rest of the Nordic and Baltic countries.

=== Switzerland ===
According to Agriculture and Agri-Food Canada, Switzerland has the second highest rate of vegetarianism in the European Union (though in fact Switzerland is not in the EU). Older governmental data from 1997 suggest that 2.3% of the population never eat meat and the observed trend seemed to point towards less meat consumption. Newer studies suggest that the percentage of vegetarians has risen to 5% by 2007. According to a 2020 survey by Swissveg, there were 5.1% vegetarians and 1% vegans.

=== United Kingdom ===
The Vegetarian Society was formed in Britain in 1847. In 1944, a faction split from the group to form The Vegan Society.

A 2021 YouGov survey found 3% of respondents said they followed a plant-based diet or were vegan.

In 2024 it was reported that 6.4% of UK adults planned to follow a vegan diet in 2025 (an estimated 3.4 million people). This includes 4.3% (an estimated 2.3 million Britons) who were not vegan at the end of 2024 but planned to start following a vegan diet in 2025.

Data published by Statista in March 2024 indicated that 7% of the UK population are vegetarians, 4% are pescetarians, and 4% are vegans.

Participation in Veganuary has become increasingly popular, with the number of people signing up rising each year.

As of January 2026, YouGov surveys find people who call themselves vegan make up 2% of the population of UK.

== North America ==
=== Canada ===
In Canada, vegetarianism is on the rise. A 2018 survey conducted by Dalhousie University researcher Sylvain Charlebois found that 9.4% of Canadian adults considered themselves either vegetarian or vegan. This included 2.3 million vegetarians (7.1% of Canada's population), up from 900,000 15 years prior, and 850,000 vegans (2.3% of Canada's population). As the majority of Canada's vegetarians are under 35, the rate of vegetarianism is expected to continue to rise.

=== Mexico ===
According to a Nielsen survey on food preferences from 2016, vegetarians make up 8% and vegans 4% of the population across Central America, with the highest numbers of both in Mexico.

=== United States ===
In 1971, 1% of U.S. citizens described themselves as vegetarians. In 2009 Harris Interactive found that 3.4% are vegetarian and 0.8% vegan. U.S. vegetarian food sales (dairy replacements such as soy milk and meat replacements such as textured vegetable protein) doubled between 1998 and 2003, reaching $1.6 billion in 2003. In 2015, a Harris Poll National Survey of 2,017 adults aged 18 and over found that eight million Americans, or 3.4%, ate a solely vegetarian diet, and that one million, or 0.4%, ate a strictly vegan diet. A 2018 Gallup poll estimated that 5% of U.S. adults consider themselves to be vegetarians. Older Americans were less likely to be vegetarian with just 2% of adults aged 55 and older saying they follow a vegetarian diet. Younger generations of Americans are more likely to be vegetarian with 7% of 35- to 54-year-olds and 8% of 18- to 34-year-olds following a vegetarian diet. According to Gallup, black Americans are three times as likely to be vegan and vegetarian as whites as of July 2018 (9% compared to 3%).

Many American children whose parents follow vegetarian diets follow them because of religious, environmental or other reasons. In the government's first estimate of how many children avoid meat, the number is about 1 in 200. The CDC survey included children ages 0 to 17 years.

By U.S. law, food packaging is regulated by the Food and Drug Administration, and generally must be labeled with a list of all its ingredients. However, there are exceptions. For example, certain trace ingredients that are "ingredients of ingredients" do not need to be listed.

==== All-vegetarian locations ====
The United States is home to two all-vegetarian locations. They are New Vrindaban in West Virginia and The Farm in Tennessee.

== Oceania ==
=== Australia ===
In Australia, some manufacturers who target the vegetarian market label their foods with the statement "suitable for vegetarians"; however, for foods intended for export to the UK, this labelling can be inconsistent because flavourings in ingredients lists do not need to specify if they come from animal origin. As such, "natural flavour" could be derived from either plant or animal sources.

Animal rights organisations such as Animal Liberation promote vegan and vegetarian diets. "Vegetarian Week" runs from 1–7 October every year, and food companies are taking advantage of the growing number of vegetarians by producing meat-free alternatives of popular dishes, including sausages and mash and spaghetti Bolognese.

A 2000 Newspoll survey (commissioned by Sanitarium) shows 44% of Australians report eating at least one meat-free evening meal a week, while 18% said they prefer plant-based meals.

=== New Zealand ===
Similar to Australia, in New Zealand the term "vegetarian" refers to individuals who eat no animal meat such as pork, chicken, and fish; they may consume animal products such as milk and eggs. In contrast, the term "vegan" is used to describe those who do not eat or use any by-products of animals. In 2002 New Zealand's vegetarians made up a minority of 1–2% of the country's 4.5 million people. By 2011 Roy Morgan Research claimed the number of New Zealanders eating an "all or almost all" vegetarian diet to be 8.1%, growing to 10.3% in 2015 (with men providing the most growth, up 63% from 5.7% to 9.3%). In New Zealand there is a strong enough movement for vegetarianism that it has created significant enough demand for a number of vegetarian and vegan retailers to set up.

As New Zealand and Australia work together to form common food standards (as seen in Food Standards Australia New Zealand (FSANZ) and the Australia New Zealand Food Standards Code), there is also a lot of ambiguity surrounding the "natural flavour" ingredients.

== South America ==
=== Brazil ===
In 2004, Marly Winckler, President of the Brazilian Vegetarian Society, claimed that 5% of the population was vegetarian. According to a 2012 survey undertaken by the Brazilian Institute of Public Opinion and Statistics, 8% of the population, or 15.2 million people, identified themselves as vegetarian. The city of São Paulo had the most vegetarians in absolute terms (792,120 people), while Fortaleza had the highest percentage, at 14% of the total population. A 2018 IBOPE survey found that 14% of Brazilians aged over 16–about 22 million people—agreed with the statement "I am vegetarian": 8% agreed totally and 6% partially. A separate 2024 analysis of Brazil’s 2017-2018 Household Budget Survey, based on two non-consecutive 24-hour dietary recalls, found that 2% of the study population reported no meat consumption.

Vegetarianismo (Portuguese pronunciation: [veʒiˌtaɾjɐ̃ˈnizmu]) is usually synonymous with lacto-ovo-vegetarianism, and vegetarians are sometimes wrongly assumed to be pescetarians and/or pollotarians who tolerate the flesh of fish or poultry, respectively. Brazilian vegetarians reportedly tend to be urban, of middle or upper class and live in the Central-Southern half of the country. Since the 1990s, and especially since the 2010s, hundreds of vegan and vegetarian restaurants have appeared in the major cities of the country.

=== Argentina ===
In Argentina, it was estimated that around 1% to 2% of the population were practicing vegetarianism in 2016. This percentage seems to be quickly rising though, as a study from 2020 put the number much higher, at about 12% of the population. The Argentine food industry now includes a wide range of locally produced plant-based brands. Many of these brands are expanding into international markets, supported by certifications and the growing global demand for sustainable food. Over 150 Argentine companies are already exporting plant-based products worldwide, and projections indicate that hundreds more could soon follow, positioning Argentina as an emerging leader in the global vegan market.

== See also ==
- European Vegetarian Union
- International Vegetarian Union
- List of vegetarian and vegan festivals
- List of vegetarian and vegan organizations
- ProVeg International
- Vegan school meals
- Vegetarianism and veganism in the Philippines
