= Likatier tribe =

Community in Füssen, Germany

Flag of the Likatier tribe

The Likatier tribe (in German Stamm der Likatier, known as Stamm Füssen Eins until 1998) is a ~200-member pseudo-religious community. More than half are minors who live and work together in Füssen, Germany. The group was founded in 1974 by Wolfgang Wankmiller, who is said to be father of 15 children by different women.

The group is not a tribe, since anyone can become a member. It owns houses and businesses in the town. Critics sometimes view it as a cult or sect, although members do not share a common religious or spiritual belief system. After indecent assaults of children within the Likatier, the group withdrew from public view.

== History ==
The community was founded in 1974 by then 17-year-old Wolfgang Wankmiller, who led it until his death in 2019.

In the first few years, according to statements up to 1990, the members were mainly involved in local politics. Environmental and civil rights as well as connections to citizens were stated as goals. The group tried to achieve its goals through individuals joining multiple parties. In the 1970s the group tried to undermine other organizations in Füssen. Wankmiller was active in local politics for a while.

In 2001, a cook in the group was sentenced to 2 1/2 years in prison for sexual abuse of five underage members. While the trial judge found that the behavior was neither condoned by nor connected to the group, critics pointed out that the cook was readmitted to the community after serving his sentence.

To counter negative publicity, the group started a website in 2003. It welcomed visitors, and recently started to offer "get-to-know" seminars.

== Practices ==
The community strives for independence and self-sufficiency with minimal environmental impact, practices ovo-lacto vegetarianism, and encourages free love while tolerating stable relationships. Separate men's and women's discussion groups meet weekly. Children are raised as a group by the women; some children are schooled privately by members in a house across the border in Austria (home schooling is not legal in Germany).

Several of the group's activities are related to esotericism, and a self-description states "our foremost goal is the perception and understanding of reality and its expression in vibrancy". The group has its own internal currency and employs a creative approach to language, giving uncommon names to days or to everyday objects. It intends to create a genuine new "tribe culture" and is in active contact with other ecological communities around the world.

The group is hierarchically organized, with members having different "levels" reflecting their commitment to the tribe. An outer circle of people join the group in some activities, but for the most part live separately.

== Structure ==
=== Hierarchy ===
The adults belong to the clan's so called "oath group". The "oath people" have sworn to stay in the group forever. These people give all their possessions to the group: apartments, cars, and inheritances.

In addition, "living people" live there, but have not committed themselves. Members had to work hard and got less money for this. At first this involved only food, accommodation and clothing, later also cash.

The "executive-circle" around Wankmiller was financially well off.

=== Business ===
The clan runs companies in different industries. In Füssen alone, the group owns at least 11 properties.

== Wolfgang Wankmiller ==
The founder of the group, Wolfgang Wankmiller, was born March 15, 1957, in Füssen and worked as a custodian. From 1984 till 1990 he was a member of the Füssen local council. Wankmiller was vice-president of the conservative Bayernpartei. He called himself the reincarnation of Jesus Christ and Albert Einstein. Members addressed him as "Jesus". He died on January 6, 2019, in Weißhaus from pneumonia.

== Reception ==
The Likatier are generally regarded with suspicion or even hostility in the city, and a citizen's action group opposes the tribe and supports people who want to leave it.

The German yellow press occasionally reports on the group in a sensationalist manner, labeling Wankmiller as a "sex-guru", claiming that he believes himself to be a reincarnation of Jesus, and accusing the group of running sex orgies in the presence of minors.

== Sources ==
- "Sex-Guru" Wankmiller und seine Anhänger breiten sich in der Stadt aus - Nun steht einer von ihnen vor Gericht, Süddeutsche Zeitung, 15 January 2001 (German)
- Report on the group, tz (Munich yellow press), 8 January 2001 (German)
- Füssen und der geächtete Clan des Phantoms, Allgäuer Zeitung, 31 August 2006 (German)
- Report from a visitor (German)
