= Narasinh Narayan Godbole =

Indian government official

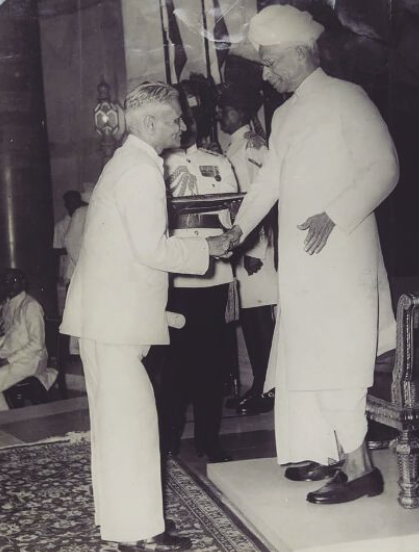
- Godbole being awarded the Padma Bhushan from Sarvepalli Radhakrishnan in 1965
- Born: 28 December 1887; Dharwad
- Died: 4 December 1984 (aged 96); Pune, India

Narasinh Narayan Godbole (28 December 1887 – 4 December 1984) was an Indian food chemist and the first Director of Industries & Supplies of Government of Rajasthan.

== Biography ==
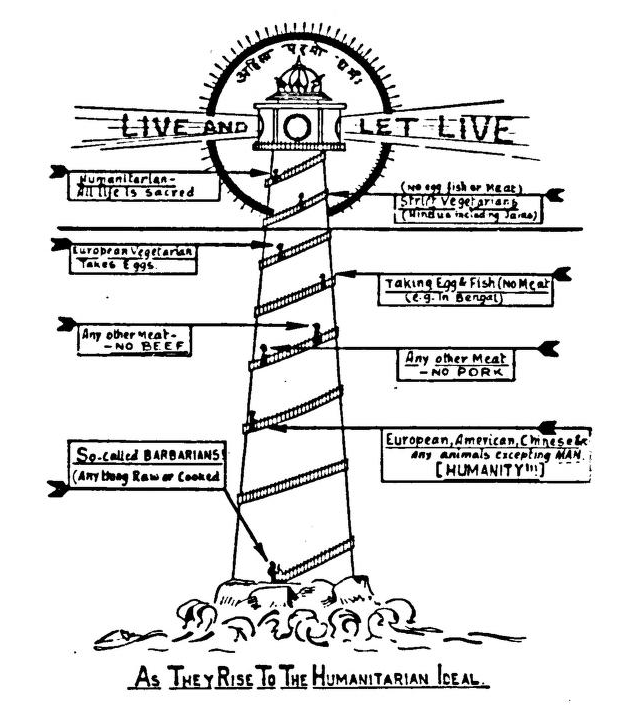
Godbole's illustration "As They Rise to the Humanitarian Ideal", 1938

Godbole was born at Dharwad. He was educated at Bombay University and qualified BSc and MA. He was a professor at D. J. Sindh Government Science College and Government Dayal Singh College, Lahore (1911–1919). In 1919, Godbole was invited by Madan Mohan Malaviya to join the Banaras Hindu University (BHU) to establish for the first time in India, the Department of Industrial Chemistry. The BHU later expanded into a College of Technology of which Godbole was appointed the first principal. He visited Japan to study industrial development.

Godbole spent two years in Germany specialising in the study of fats, oils and soaps. He obtained his PhD from Berlin University in 1925. Godbole was a lecturer on modern industrial development in Japan at the Universities of Banaras, Delhi, Calcutta & Mysore. After retiring from BHU in 1948 he was Director of Industries of Rajasthan (1949–1959).

He was known for his research on milk products and Sarasvati River. He was awarded the Padma Bhushan, third highest civilian honour of India by the President of India, in 1965. Godbole invented a new "Home Pasteurizer" for domestic use. He was a member of the Indian Chemical Society.

== Vegetarianism ==
Godbole was an advocate of lacto-vegetarianism. He authored Milk: The Most Perfect Food, in 1936. A review of the book in the Current Science journal, noted that "this is an excellent treatise, worthy to be in every household. Prof. Godbole has approached his task in a scientific spirit and in the performance of it he displays the commendable zeal of the convinced advocate of the principles he wishes to propagate." A review in the Journal of Dairy Science, commented that Godbole "presents the dairy industry of India with special reference to improvement of the Hindu diet through increased consumption of dairy products... The promotion of the vegetarian diet is uppermost in the thoughts of the author which is essential in India for both religious and health reasons." Godbole corresponded with Mahatma Gandhi. In a 1937 letter, Gandhi wrote that the book "is good so far as it goes" but was disappointed that it did not examine the methods of using milk.

== Death ==
Godbole died in Pune on 4 December 1984.

== Selected publications ==
- Milk: The Most Perfect Food (with a foreword by Madan Mohan Malaviya, 1936)
- Butter-Fat (Ghee) (1939)
- Rig-Vedic Sarasvati (1963)
