= Vegetarianism and veganism in the Philippines =

Vegetarianism and veganism in the Philippines represents a significant departure in the traditional meat and seafood-based diet. Filipino cuisine features a variety of plant-based dishes influenced by indigenous practices, religious fasting traditions, and international culinary trends.

In recent years interest in vegetarian and vegan lifestyles increased, driven by health concerns, environmental awareness, animal welfare advocacy, and global movements.

== History ==
According to Quezon City-based food historian Felice Prudente Sta. Maria, Spanish, Chinese and American influences have shaped Filipino cuisine as well as modern attitudes—including resistance—toward vegetarianism and veganism.

== Communities ==
Accounts on social media platforms bring awareness about vegetarianism and veganism. Manila Vegans, a Facebook group with over 53,000 followers founded by Nancy Siy, supports a growing vegan community and highlights issues such as animal cruelty in the Philippine food industry.

== Proponents ==
Filipinos from various backgrounds have contributed to the vegan and vegetarian movements.

Dhanvan Saulo is the co-founder of the Cosmic restaurant chain, which has two outlets in Manila and one on the island of Siargao.

Tita Soliongco is the founder of The Vegetarian Kitchen, Manila's longest continually operating vegetarian establishment.

Auggie Yap-Suratos and Israel Suratos are the co-founders of The Vegan Grocer, a vegetarian and vegan retailer with two outposts in Manila, one in San Juan City and one in Las Piñas City.

Vegan Filipino celebrities include Nadine Lustre.

== Veganism ==
Vegan traditional Filipino foods include laing, banana cue, buko, ginataang bilo-bilo, ginataang langka, kamote cue, laing, puto, taho, and turon.

Dozens of vegetarian restaurants operate throughout the country.

The annual VegFest Pilipinas was established in 2016. It is the first vegan event in the Philippines and the largest vegan festival in Asia.

== See also ==
- Vegetarianism by country
