= Dessert crop =

Dessert crops are defined as types of crops or plants that are not (or historically were not) used in everyday consumption. They are used for "dessert," which is a loose definition for special occasions, for use by the elite, or for pleasure rather than sustenance.

Some examples of such crops in the past are coffee, sugar, tea, tobacco and cocoa. While these crops are more of everyday staples in modern times, a few centuries ago this was not the case. They were regarded as extravagances, as "sinful" indulgences, or even instruments of the Devil.
