= Pescetarianism =

Including seafood in an otherwise vegetarian diet

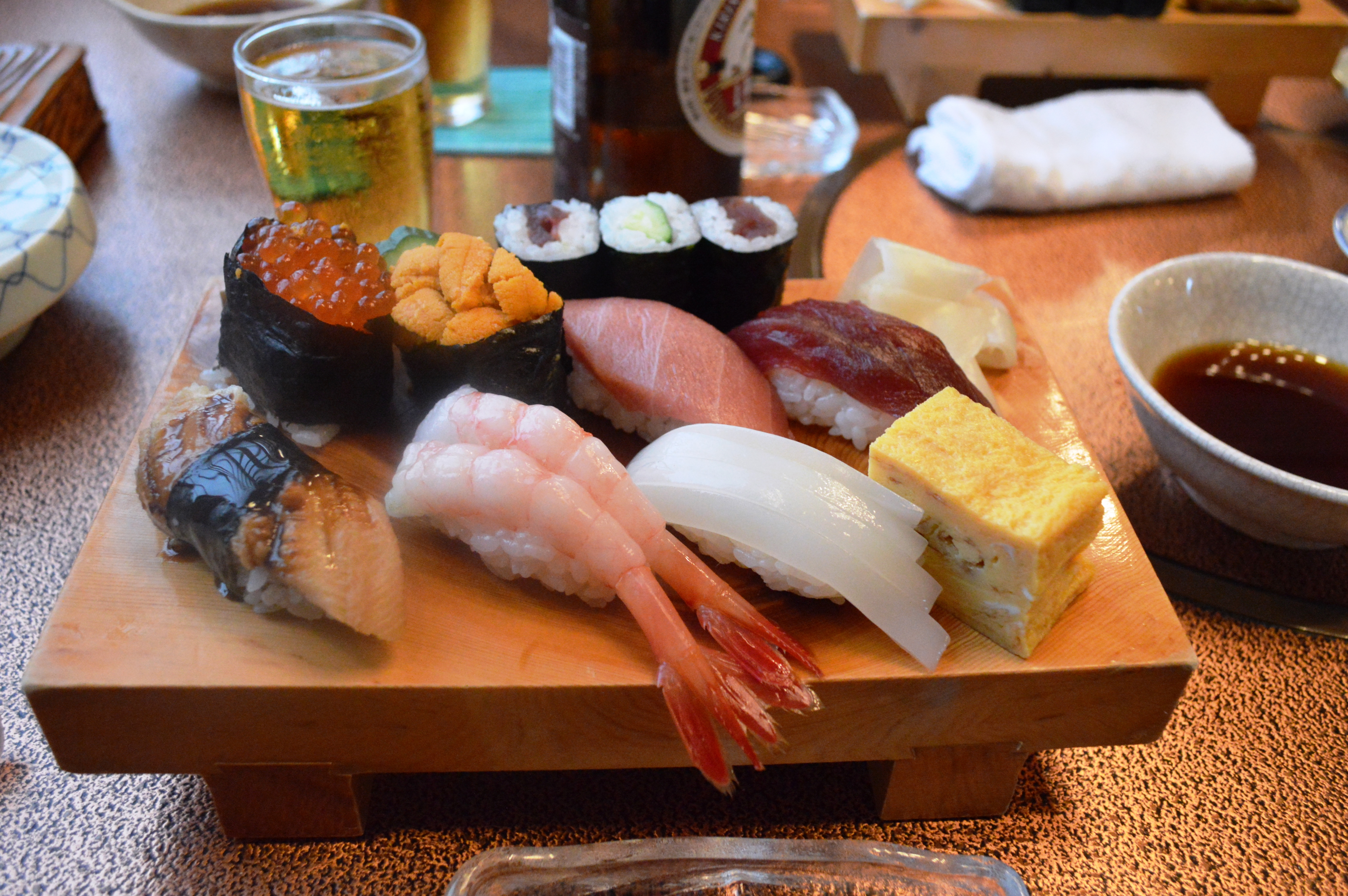
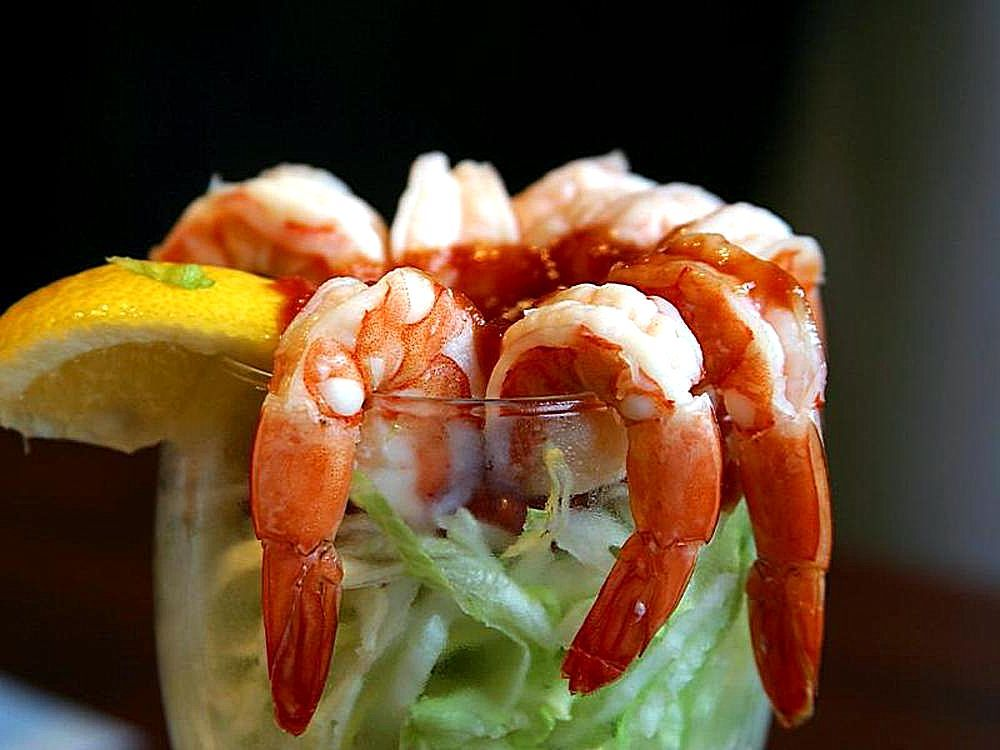
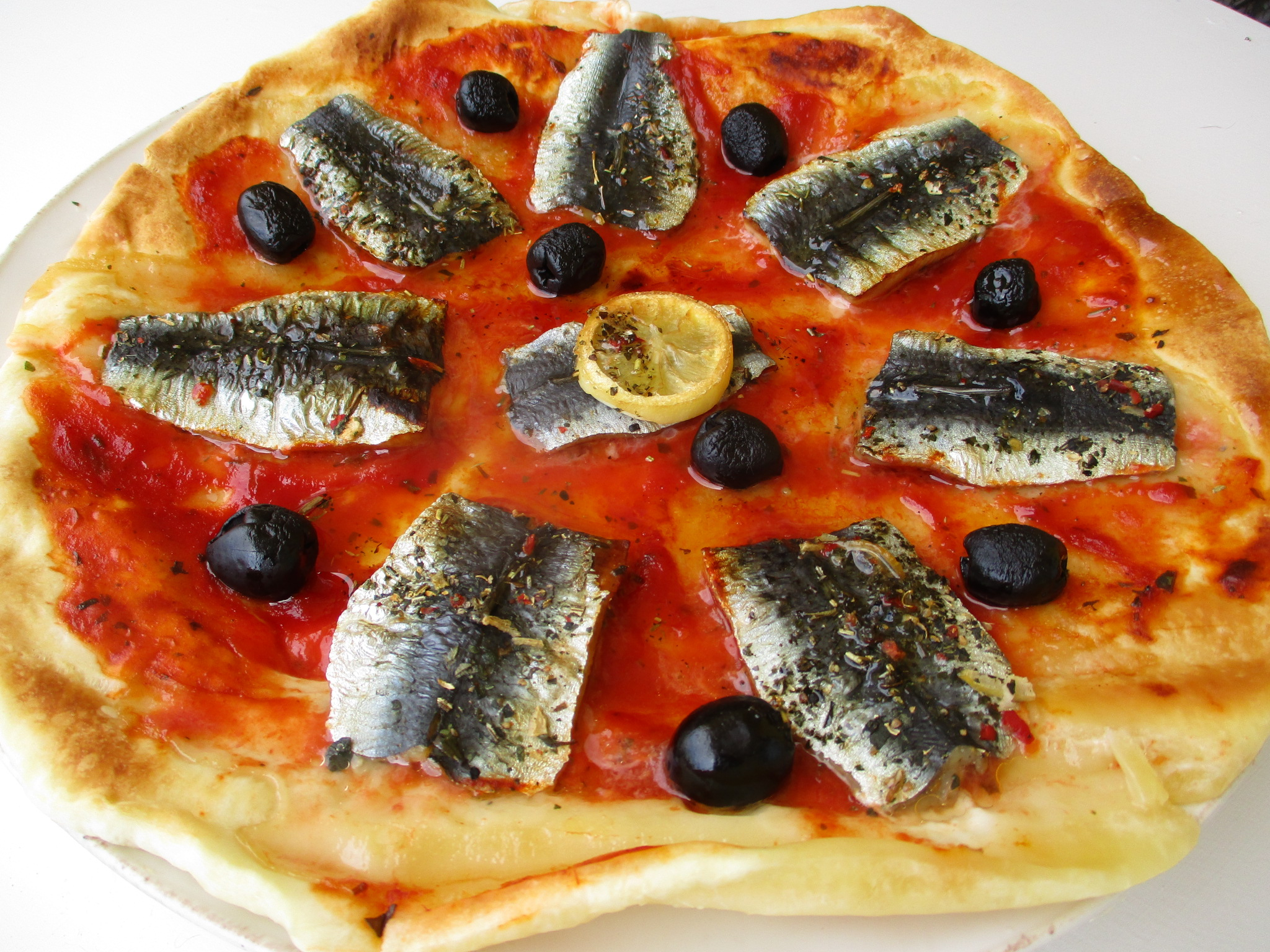
- Japanese sushi; shrimp cocktail with lettuce; pizza topped with sardines and olives. These are compatible with a pescetarian diet

Description
- A diet in which seafood and freshwater fish are the only meat

Related Dietary Choices
- Related diets: Vegetarianism, veganism, pollotarianism, semi-vegetarianism, plant-based diet

Pescetarianism (/ˌpɛskəˈtɛəri.ənɪzəm/ PESK-ə-TAIR-ee-ə-niz-əm; sometimes spelled pescatarianism) is a dietary practice in which seafood is the only source of meat in a diet. Other animal products, such as eggs and dairy, may also be included. According to research conducted from 2017 to 2018, approximately 3% of adults worldwide are pescetarian.

== Definition and etymology ==
"Pescetarian" is a neologism formed as a portmanteau of the Italian word pesce ('fish', pronounced [ˈpeʃ.ʃe]) and the English word "vegetarian". The term was coined in the United Kingdom in the late 1980s. "Pesco-vegetarian" is a synonymous term that is seldom used outside of academic research, but it has sometimes appeared in other American publications and literature since at least 1980.

== History ==
=== Early history ===
The first vegetarians in written western history may have been the Pythagoreans, a title derived from the Greek philosopher Pythagoras. Though Pythagoras loaned his name to the meatless diet, some biographers suspect he may have eaten fish as well at some points, which would have made him not a vegetarian but a pescetarian by today's standards. Many of Pythagoras's philosophies inspired Plato, who advocated for the moral and nutritional superiority of vegetarian-oriented diets. In Plato's ideal republic, a healthy diet would consist of cereals, seeds, beans, fruit, milk, honey and fish.

In 675, the consumption of livestock and wild animals, with the exception of deer and wild boar, was banned in Japan by Emperor Tenmu, due to the influence of Buddhism and the lack of arable land. Subsequently, in the year 737 of the Nara period, the Emperor Shōmu approved the eating of fish and shellfish. During the 1200 years from the Nara period to the Meiji Restoration in the latter half of the 19th century, Japanese people ate vegetarian-style meals, and on special occasions, seafood was served. Exceptions were wild fowl served amongst the Heian nobility, and when Europeans arrived in Japan in the 15th century, the Japanese diet included boar meat.

Several orders of monks in medieval Europe restricted or banned the consumption of meat for ascetic reasons, but none of them abstained from the consumption of fish; these monks were not vegetarians, but some were pescetarians.

Marcion of Sinope and his followers ate fish but no fowl or red meat. Fish was seen by the Marcionites as a holier kind of food. They consumed bread, fish, honey, milk, and vegetables.

The "Hearers" of the ecclesiastical hierarchy of Manichaeism lived on a diet of fish, grain, and vegetables. Consumption of land animals was forbidden, based on the Manichaean belief that "fish, being born in and of the waters, and without any sexual connexion on the part of other fishes, are free from the taint which pollutes all animals".

The Rule of Saint Benedict insisted upon total abstinence of meat from four-footed animals, except in cases of the sick. Benedictine monks thus followed a diet based on vegetables, eggs, milk, butter, cheese, and fish. Paul the Deacon specified that cheese, eggs, and fish were part of a monk's ordinary diet. Benedictine monk Walafrid Strabo commented, "Some salt, bread, leeks, fish and wine; that is our menu."

The Carthusians followed a strict diet that consisted of fish, cheese, eggs, and vegetables, with only bread and water on Fridays.

In the 13th century, Cistercian monks consumed fish and eggs. Ponds were created for fish farming. From the early 14th century, Benedictine and Cistercian monks no longer abstained from consuming meat of four-footed animals. In 1336, Pope Benedict XII permitted monks to eat meat four days a week outside of the fast season if it was not served in the refectory.

The anchorites of England ate a pescetarian diet of fish seasoned with apples and herbs, bean or pea soup and milk, butter and oil.

=== 19th century to present ===
Francis William Newman, who was President of the Vegetarian Society from 1873 to 1883, made an associate membership possible for people who were not completely vegetarian like pescetarians. Eventually, in the 1890s, Newman himself switched from following an ovo-lacto-vegetarian diet to a pescetarian diet, with the rationale that fish do not waste land space, are plentiful due to high reproduction rates, do not care for their young and have no parental feelings to violate, and can be captured and slaughtered in ways that inflict minimal pain.

Interest in pescetarian diets continued to grow into the 21st century, alongside broader trends in plant based eating. Surveys in the 2010s and beyond have found that a small but noticeable segment of populations in Western countries identify with pescetarian or related diets, often citing environmental motivations for reducing consumption of red and processed meats in favor of seafood and plant foods.

A 2016 book Seagan Eating promoted a seafood diet, which is distinguished from ordinary pescetarian diets because it discourages consumption of dairy and eggs.

== Trends and demographics ==
As of 2020, pescetarianism has been described as a plant-based diet. Regular fish consumption and decreased red meat consumption are recognized as dietary practices that may promote health. Pescetarianism has been shown to be more popular among women than men in all regions where the data on sex ratio is available.

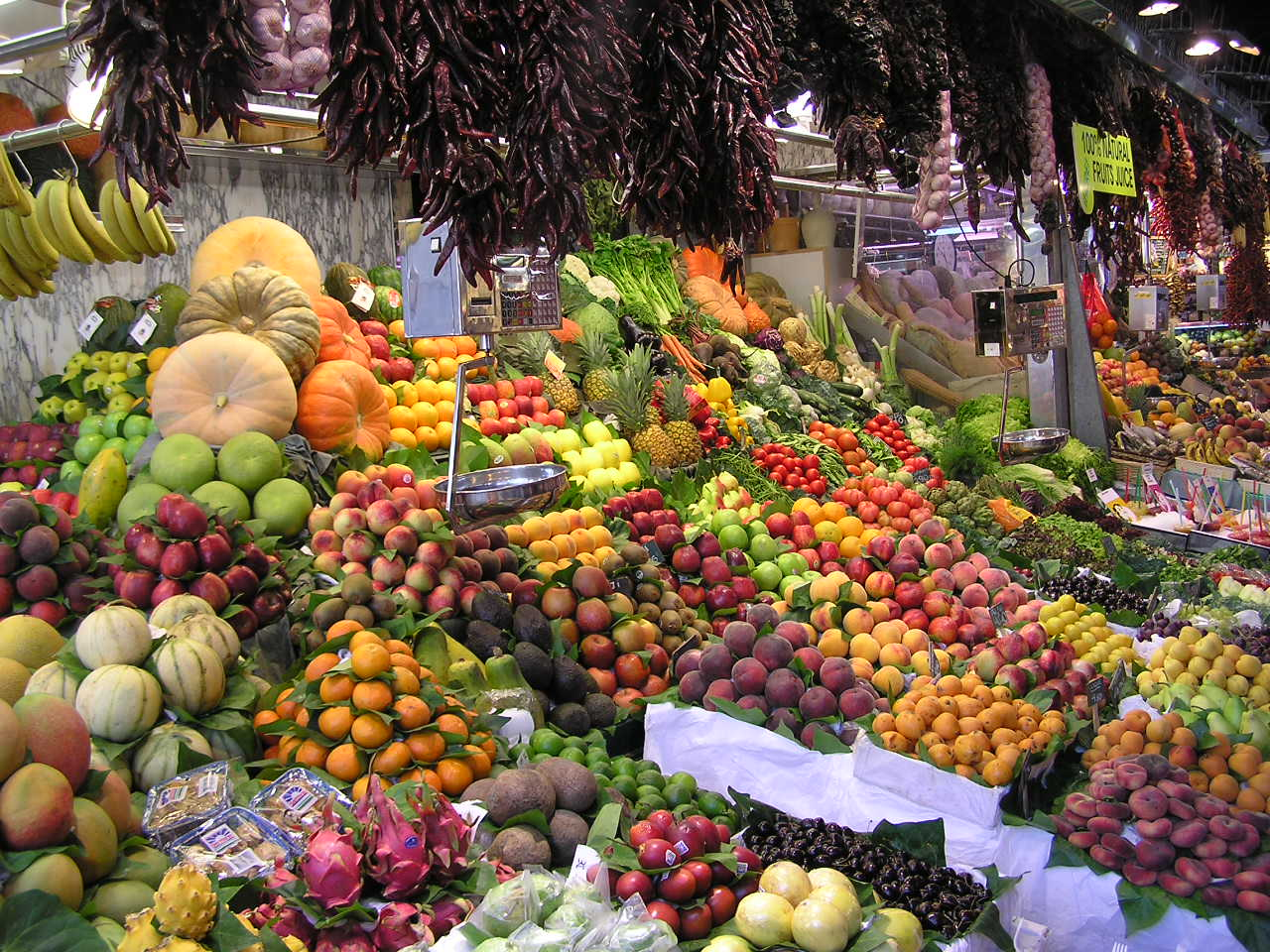
Plant foods, such as fresh produce, make up most of a pescetarian diet.

=== Global ===
In 2018, Ipsos MORI reported 73% of people worldwide followed a diet where both meat and non-animal products were regularly consumed, with 14% considered as flexitarians, 5% vegetarians, 3% vegans, and 3% pescetarians. These are similar to the results collected by GlobalData just a year earlier; where 23% of the sample had below average meat consumption, 5% had vegetarian diets, 2% had vegan diets and 3% had pescetarian diets. Globally, pescetarian diets seem to have increased in popularity in the mid-to-late 2010s; only 40% of pescetarians surveyed had been adhering to the diet for more than a couple years and another 18% reported adhering to diet for about a year.

=== United Kingdom ===
A 2018 poll of 2,000 United Kingdom adults found that ~12% of adults adhered to a meat-free diet; with 2% vegan, 6–7% ovo-lacto-vegetarian, and 4% pescetarian. Different studies and survey have found a more modest number of meat-abstainers; a 2021 survey found 10% of Brits were meat abstainers with 3% of the population being pescetarians.

In Great Britain as of January 2019, women between 18 and 24 years of age were the most likely demographic group to follow a pescetarian diet. In general, men were less interested in pescetarianism, and men 35 years and above were the least likely to adhere to a pescetarian diet pattern.

=== Other regions ===
In 2018, one survey found that people in Africa and the Middle East had a high incidence of pescetarian diets (5%) when compared to other areas of the world. In Europe, the incidence of pescetarianism varied by country, according to a 2020 survey documenting the dietary practices of residents in seven European nations: on average, pescetarianism was about 3% of the EU population, with slightly higher incidence in Germany and Belgium.

Comparison of selected vegetarian and non-vegetarian diets
		Plants and seeds	Dairy	Eggs	Honey	Birds	Seafood and freshwater fish	All other animals
Vegetarianism	Lacto-ovo vegetarianism	Yes	Yes	Yes	Yes	No	No	No
Vegetarianism	Lacto vegetarianism	Yes	Yes	No	Yes	No	No	No
Vegetarianism	Ovo vegetarianism	Yes	No	Yes	Yes	No	No	No
Vegetarianism	Jain vegetarianism	Yes	Yes	No	No	No	No	No
Vegetarianism	Veganism	Yes	No	No	No	No	No	No
Non-vegetarianism	Flexitarianism	Yes	Yes	Yes	Yes	Sometimes	Sometimes	Sometimes
Non-vegetarianism	Pollotarianism	Yes	Maybe	Maybe	Yes	Yes	No	No
Non-vegetarianism	Pescetarianism	Yes	Maybe	Maybe	Yes	No	Yes	No

== Motivations and rationale ==
=== Animal welfare concerns ===
Pescetarianism may be perceived as a more ethical choice because fish and shellfish may not experience fear, pain, and suffering as more complex animals like mammals and other tetrapods do. As a counterargument, from a scientific viewpoint, there are functional areas in the brains of fish that can make them feel pain. Furthermore, fish have pain receptors similar to humans, and evidence shows that pain signals are sent from these receptors to the brain, enabling fish to feel pain. However, this is an ongoing debate.

Some pescetarians may regard their diet as a transition to vegetarianism, while others may consider it an ethical compromise, often as a practical necessity to obtain nutrients that are absent, not easily found, or not readily bioavailable in plants.

=== Sustainability and environmental concerns ===
It is common for all kinds of meat-abstainers to participate in the "green movement" and be conscientious about global food sustainability and environmentalism; switching to a pescetarian dietary pattern can potentially positively affect both. People may adopt a pescetarian diet out of desire to lower their dietary carbon footprint. A 2014 lifecycle analysis of greenhouse gas emissions estimated that a pescetarian diet would provide a 45% reduction in emissions compared to an omnivorous diet. Research on the diets of over 55,000 UK residents found that meat-eaters had dietary greenhouse gas emissions that were about 50% higher than pescetarians. Compared to an omnivorous diet, pescetarian diets also had 64% less environmental impact overall when the amount of greenhouse gas emissions, land use and cumulative energy demand were assessed together.

A Japanese study in 2018 found that various diet changes could successfully reduce the Japanese food-nitrogen footprint, particularly by adopting a pescetarian diet which may reduce the impact on nitrogen. Switching from an omnivorous diet to a pescetarian diet also carries high potential in reducing American food loss because fish and shellfish contribute markedly less to food waste at the primary, retail and consumer levels than both red meat and poultry. Additionally, water conservation may be a motivator; a multinational study found that switching a conventional diet for a balanced pescetarian diet could reduce dietary water footprint by 33% to 55%.

=== Health research ===
A common reason for adoption of pescetarianism may be health-related, such as fish and plant food consumption as part of the Mediterranean diet, which is associated with lowered risk of cardiovascular diseases. Pescetarian diets are under preliminary research for their potential to affect diabetes, long-term weight gain, and all-cause mortality.

=== Other considerations ===
Concerns have been raised about consuming some fish varieties containing toxins such as mercury and polychlorinated biphenyls (PCB), although it is possible to select fish that contain little or no mercury or moderate the consumption of mercury-containing fish. According to a 2018 global consumer survey, the majority of pescetarians, vegetarians and vegans (87% prevalence) reported that their food product choices are influenced by ideological factors, like ethical concerns, environmental impact or social responsibility. Pescetarians may be motivated by ethical concerns that are not related to animal protection or environmental protection, such as humanitarian or religious reasons.

== In religions ==
=== Christianity ===
In both the Roman Catholic and Eastern Orthodox tradition, pescetarianism is referred to as a form of abstinence. During fast periods, Eastern Orthodox Christians often abstain from meat, dairy, eggs, and fish, but on holidays that occur on fast days (for example, 15 August on a Wednesday or Friday), fish is allowed, while meat and dairy remain forbidden. Anthonian fasting has been considered a pescetarian-like variant of Orthodox fasting as poultry and red meat are restricted throughout the year but fish, eggs, oils, dairy and wine are allowed most days.

Pescetarianism is relatively popular among Seventh-day Adventists when compared to the general population; in the 2000s 10% of North American Seventh-day Adventists who were surveyed reported adhering to a pescetarian diet. The higher popularity is likely due to the church promoting a "health message" to its followers and considering meat-consumption to be unfavorable. Adventists who eat seafood do not eat shellfish because the church expects all followers to only eat kosher foods deemed permissible by Leviticus 11.

=== Judaism ===
Pescetarianism, provided that the fish is kosher, conforms to Jewish dietary laws. Fish and all other seafood animals must have both fins and scales in order to be considered kosher. Thus, aquatic mammals such as dolphins and whales are not kosher, nor are cartilaginous fish such as sharks and rays, since they all have dermal denticles and not true bony-fish scales. The lack of fins and scales also deems crustaceans (e.g., shrimp, crab, lobster) and molluscs (e.g., oyster, clam, conch, octopus, squid) to be non-kosher. Roe, such as caviar, must come from a kosher fish to be permitted. Pescetarian diets simplify adherence to the Judaic separation of meat and dairy products, as kosher fish is considered pareve ("neutral")—neither "milk" nor "meat", which must be separated from one another.

In 2015, members of the Liberal Judaism synagogue in Manchester, England, founded The Pescetarian Society, citing pescetarianism as originally a Jewish diet, and pescetarianism as a form of vegetarianism. The society has several advocacy interests: public health, promoting healthy eating, praising pescetarianism as "the natural human diet", supporting better animal welfare, bringing awareness to the climate-change crisis, and demanding seafood be sustainable and responsibly-caught.

=== Hinduism ===
Some Hindus, by choice, follow a strict lacto-vegetarian diet and in India up to 44% of Hindus self-identify as some type of vegetarian. However, there are Hindus who consume fish, mainly from coastal southwestern India. This community regards seafood in general as "vegetables from the sea", and refrains from eating land-based animals. Other Hindus who consume seafood are those from Bengal, Odisha, and other coastal areas. In Bengal, Hindus consume fish and are known to cook it daily.

=== Rastafari ===
The expression of Ital eating can vary from Rasta to Rasta, but a general principle is that food should be natural or pure, and from the earth. Though the Rastafari are generally associated with avid vegetarianism and veganism, a large minority of adherents do deem certain kinds of fish to be an acceptable exception in the Ital diet. Rastafari who permit fish will avoid eating all kinds of shellfish as they are considered to be "unclean" scavengers, a belief that stems from biblical teachings.

== See also ==
- Ikaria Study – Dietary study of long-lived Ikarian people found to have semi-vegetarian diets similar to pescetarianism.
- List of diets – A comprehensive index of diets covered on Wikipedia
- Mediterranean diet – Diet inspired by eating habits of the lands surrounding the Mediterranean Sea.
- Okinawa diet – Eating habits of the indigenous people of the Ryukyu Islands.
- Piscivore – Animals that eat mainly fish
- Semi-vegetarianism – Other forms of semi-vegetarianism that include occasional seafood or meat consumption.
- Filet-O-Fish – Created in response to Catholics not eating meat on Fridays, but permitting fish.
