= Pollotarianism =

Including poultry in an otherwise vegetarian diet

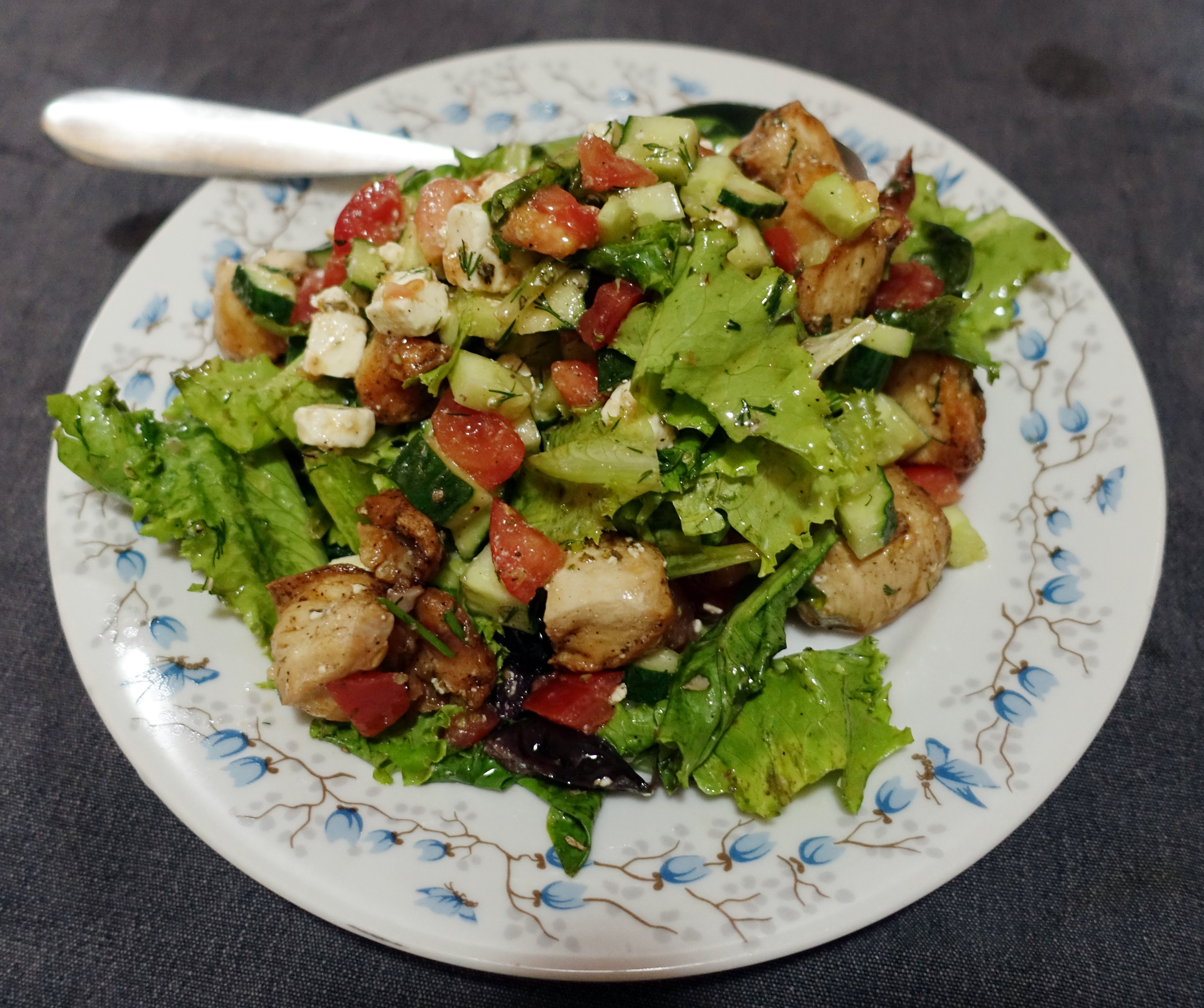
- Chicken and vegetables; foodstuffs compatible with a pollotarian diet

Description
- A diet in which poultry is the only meat

Related Dietary Choices
- Related diets: Veganism, Vegetarianism, Semi-vegetarianism, Pescetarianism, Plant-based diet

Pollotarianism is the practice of adhering to a diet that incorporates poultry as the only source of meat in an otherwise vegetarian diet.

== History ==
While pollo specifically means chicken in both Spanish and Italian (with pollame meaning poultry in general in Italian), pollotarians are known to also incorporate different forms of poultry, like duck and turkey, in their diet. Pollotarians may also eat dairy products, eggs and honey.

The term "pollo-vegetarian" was first used in nutritional textbooks in the 1980s to describe a semi-vegetarian diet that incorporates poultry. Historian Rod Preece describes pollotarians as "those who refrain from mammals, but are willing to eat the flesh of birds, notably chickens."

== Comparison ==
Comparison of selected vegetarian and non-vegetarian diets
		Plants and seeds	Dairy	Eggs	Honey	Birds	Seafood and freshwater fish	All other animals
Vegetarianism	Lacto-ovo vegetarianism	Yes	Yes	Yes	Yes	No	No	No
Vegetarianism	Lacto vegetarianism	Yes	Yes	No	Yes	No	No	No
Vegetarianism	Ovo vegetarianism	Yes	No	Yes	Yes	No	No	No
Vegetarianism	Jain vegetarianism	Yes	Yes	No	No	No	No	No
Vegetarianism	Veganism	Yes	No	No	No	No	No	No
Non-vegetarianism	Flexitarianism	Yes	Yes	Yes	Yes	Sometimes	Sometimes	Sometimes
Non-vegetarianism	Pollotarianism	Yes	Maybe	Maybe	Yes	Yes	No	No
Non-vegetarianism	Pescetarianism	Yes	Maybe	Maybe	Yes	No	Yes	No

== Examples ==
Politician Chauncey Depew was a pollotarian. In a 1925 interview aged 90, Depew stated that "For thirty years the only meat I've eaten has been poultry". Matt Damon lost weight for the movie Courage Under Fire by sticking to a chicken-only diet. Adam Driver ate only one full rotisserie chicken and six eggs a day along with running to maintain his fitness during his days in Juilliard School. Indian actor and star Shah Rukh Khan as well as Emraan Hashmi are well-known for their pollotarianism.

== See also ==
- Duck as food
- Turkey as food
- Chicken as food
- Pescatarianism
