= Lacto vegetarianism =

Vegetarian diet allowing dairy products

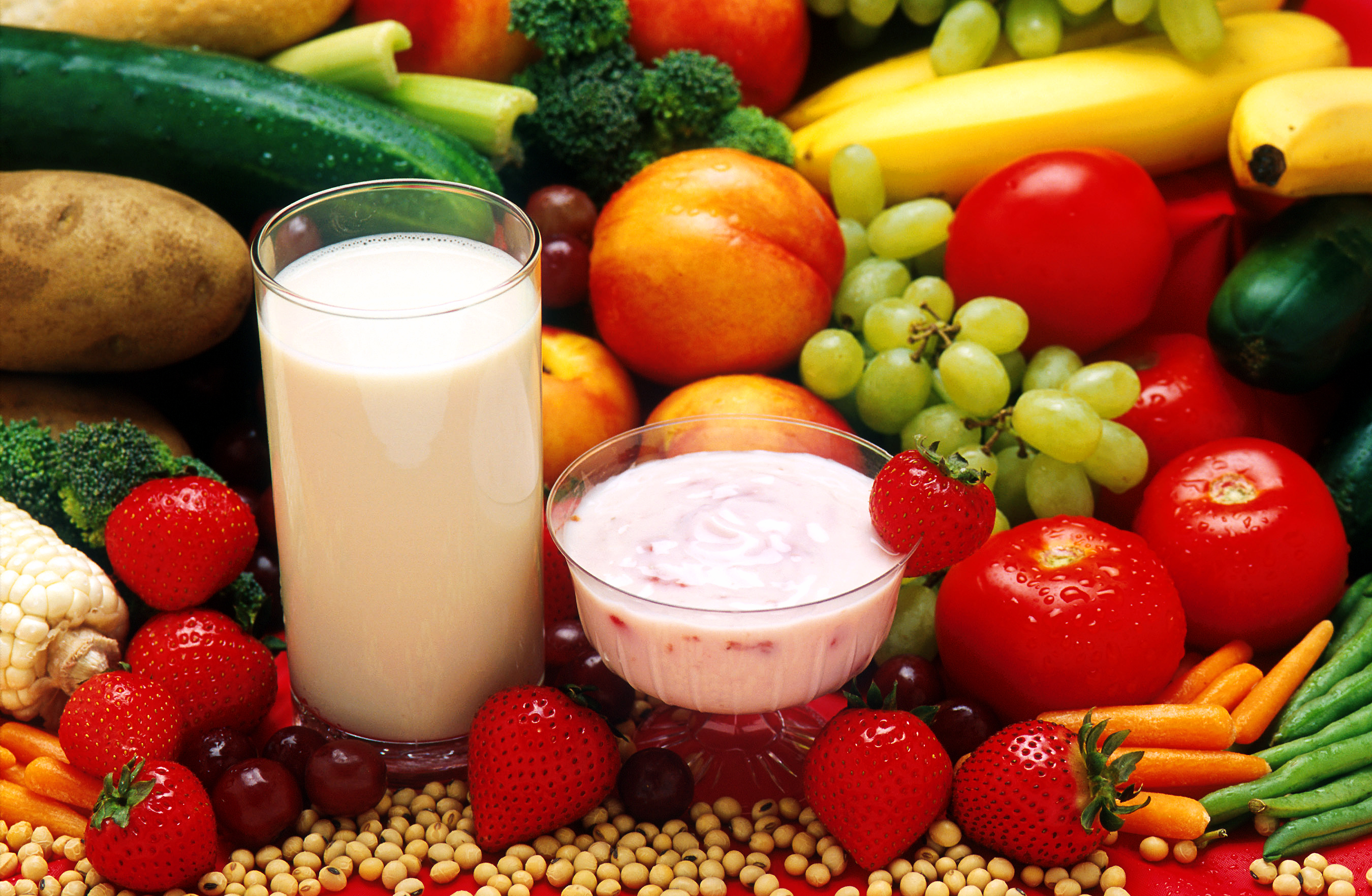
Lacto-vegetarians consume dairy products and honey, but not eggs or meat.

A lacto-vegetarian (sometimes referred to as a lactarian; from the Latin root lact, meaning "milk") diet abstains from the consumption of eggs as well as meat, while still consuming dairy products such as milk, cheese (without animal rennet, i.e., from microbial sources), yogurt, butter, ghee, cream, and kefir, as well as honey.

== History ==
The concept and practice of lacto-vegetarianism among a significant number of people comes from ancient India.

An early western advocate of lacto-vegetarianism was the Scottish physician George Cheyne who promoted a milk and vegetable-based diet to treat obesity and other health problems in the early 18th century.

During the 19th century, the diet became associated with naturopathy. German naturopaths Heinrich Lahmann and Theodor Hahn promoted lacto-vegetarian diets of raw vegetables, whole wheat bread, and dairy products such as milk.

In the 20th century, lacto-vegetarianism was promoted by the American biochemist Elmer McCollum and the Danish physician and nutritionist Mikkel Hindhede. In 1918, McCollum commented that "lacto-vegetarianism should not be confused with strict vegetarianism. The former is, when the diet is properly planned, the most highly satisfactory plan which can be adopted in the nutrition of man."

Hindhede became a food advisor to the Danish government during World War I and was influential in introducing a lacto-vegetarian diet to the public. The system of rationing restricted meat and alcohol so the Danish population were mostly living on a diet of milk and vegetables. During the years of food restriction from 1917 to 1918, both mortality and morbidity decreased; the mortality rate dropped by 34%, the lowest death rate ever reported for Denmark. Hindhede's dieting ideas expressed in his scientific publications, along with those written by other Scandinavian scientists, were translated in German and well received amongst the right-wing political spectrum in post-war Germany. Subsequently, lacto-vegetarianism was strongly supported by German life reformers (Lebensreform) and became influential on some of the leading exponents of the National Socialist movement.

The uric-acid free diet of 19th century Scottish physician and dietitian Alexander Haig was lacto-vegetarian. On this diet only cheese, milk, nuts, certain vegetables, and white bread could be eaten.

Mahatma Gandhi was a notable lacto-vegetarian, who drank milk daily. In 1931, Gandhi commented that:

I know we must all err. I would give up milk if I could, but I cannot. I have made that experiment times without number. I could not, after a serious illness, regain my strength, unless I went back to milk. That has been the tragedy of my life.

In 1936, Narasinh Narayan Godbole authored Milk: The Most Perfect Food, a book defending lacto-vegetarianism and promoting the consumption of dairy products in opposition to meat.

== Rennet ==
Historically most commercial cheese was made with calf rennet, making this an issue for lacto-vegetarians. Fig and thistle rennet were used in ancient times but such plant-based rennets were not suitable for the manufacture of long-ripened cheese varieties so calf rennet became the standard until there was a shortage of supply.

John Smith in his book The Principles and Practice of Vegetarian Cookery in 1860 wrote about a "vegetable rennet" made from the flowers of Galium verum. In 1898, W. A. Macdonald in The Vegetarian magazine commented that fig and thistle rennet had been successful in experiment but only calf rennet had commercial significance. In India in the late 19th-century, the berries from Withania coagulans were used as a vegetarian rennet and sold in powdered capsules.

Most commercial cheese in the United States is currently made using chymosin. Some vegetarians consider this an acceptable alternative, whilst others do not as the gene used to make microbial chymosin originated from calves.

== Religion ==
Lacto-vegetarian diets are popular with certain followers of the Dharmic religious traditions such as Hinduism, Jainism, Buddhism, and Sikhism. The core of their beliefs behind a lacto-vegetarian diet is the law of ahimsa, or non-violence.

=== Hinduism ===
According to the Vedas (Hindu holy scriptures), all living beings are equally valued. Hindus believe that vegetarianism is vital for spiritual progress. It takes many more vegetables or plants to produce an equal amount of meat, many more lives are destroyed, and in this way more suffering is caused when meat is consumed. Although some suffering and pain is inevitably caused to other living beings to satisfy the human need for food, according to ahimsa, every effort should be made to minimize suffering. This is to avoid karmic consequences and show respect for living things, because all living beings are equally valued in these traditions, a vegetarian diet rooted in ahimsa is only one aspect of environmentally conscious living, relating to those beings affected by our need for food. However, this does not apply to all Hindus; some do consume meat, though usually not any form of beef.

In India, lacto-vegetarian is considered synonymous to vegetarian, while eggs are considered a meat product. However, in other parts of the world, vegetarianism generally refers to ovo–lacto vegetarianism instead, allowing eggs into the diet.

Many Hindu wrestlers are strict lacto-vegetarians and follow a Sattvic diet. A large part of their diet is milk, ghee, almonds and chickpeas.

=== Jainism ===
In the case of Jainism, the vegetarian standard is strict. It allows the consumption of only fruit and leaves that can be taken from plants without causing their death. This further excludes from the diet root vegetables like carrots, potatoes, onions, garlic, radish, turnips, turmeric, etc since uprooting plants is considered as bad karma in Jainism. Jains also do not consume honey since it is considered as stealing food and also because honey collecting destroys bee hives and bee eggs and bee larvae inside it.

=== Sikhism ===
The Namdharis, a Sikh sect, follow a strict lacto-vegetarian diet and have quoted verses from the Guru Granth Sahib endorsing vegetarianism; they also advocate for cow protection. The Damdami Taksal also cite the Guru Granth Sahib and advocate a strict lacto-vegetarian diet. Eating meat is not allowed in any form including eggs, fish and gelatine.

== Lacto-vegetarians and vegans ==
The primary difference between a vegan, an ovo-vegetarian and a lacto-vegetarian diet is the avoidance of dairy products and honey. Vegans do not consume dairy products (like ovo-vegetarians) and honey (unlike ovo-, lacto-, or ovo-lacto vegetarians), believing that their production causes the animal suffering or a premature death, or otherwise abridges animal rights.

== Comparison ==
Comparison of selected vegetarian and non-vegetarian diets
		Plants and seeds	Dairy	Eggs	Honey	Birds	Seafood and freshwater fish	All other animals
Vegetarianism	Lacto-ovo vegetarianism	Yes	Yes	Yes	Yes	No	No	No
Vegetarianism	Lacto vegetarianism	Yes	Yes	No	Yes	No	No	No
Vegetarianism	Ovo vegetarianism	Yes	No	Yes	Yes	No	No	No
Vegetarianism	Jain vegetarianism	Yes	Yes	No	No	No	No	No
Vegetarianism	Veganism	Yes	No	No	No	No	No	No
Non-vegetarianism	Flexitarianism	Yes	Yes	Yes	Yes	Sometimes	Sometimes	Sometimes
Non-vegetarianism	Pollotarianism	Yes	Maybe	Maybe	Yes	Yes	No	No
Non-vegetarianism	Pescetarianism	Yes	Maybe	Maybe	Yes	No	Yes	No

== See also ==
- Lacto–ovo vegetarianism
- List of butter dishes
- List of cheese dishes
- List of dairy products
- List of diets
- List of vegetable dishes
- Ovo vegetarianism
- Sentient foods
- Vegetarianism
- VeggieBoards, a vegetarian forum
