= Ovo vegetarianism =

Diet allowing eggs but excluding dairy

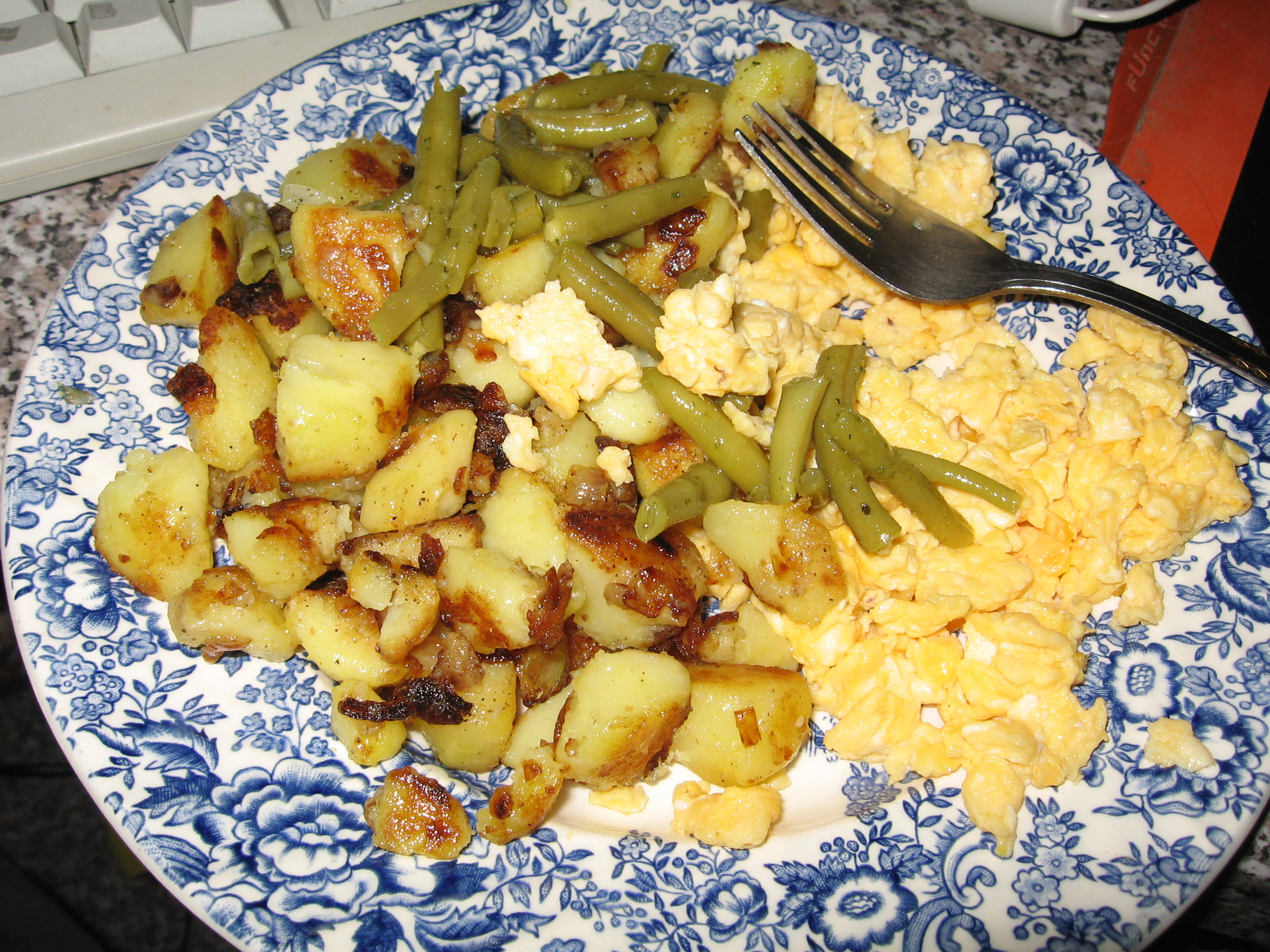
Ovo-vegetarians consume eggs and honey, but not dairy or animal meat and flesh.

Ovo vegetarianism (/ˈoʊvoʊ/) or eggitarianism is a type of diet which allows for the consumption of eggs and honey but not dairy products, in contrast with lacto vegetarianism. Those who practice ovo vegetarianism are called ovo-vegetarians. "Ovo" comes from the Latin word for egg.

== Etymology ==
The term ovo vegetarianism was used as early as 1952. Ovo comes from the Latin word ovum, meaning egg. Ovo vegetarianism refers to a diet free from meat, fish, and dairy products or ingredients with the exception of eggs and honey.

== Motivations ==
Ethical motivations for excluding dairy products are based on issues with the industrial practices behind the production of milk. Concerns include the practice of keeping a cow constantly pregnant in order for her to lactate and the slaughter of unwanted male calves. Other concerns include the standard practice of separating the mother from her calf and denying the calf its natural source of milk. This contrasts with the industrial practices surrounding egg-laying hens, which produce eggs for human consumption without being fertilized. Ovo-vegetarians often prefer free-range eggs, that is, those produced by uncaged hens.

== Concerns ==
Ethical concerns about the consumption of eggs arise from the practice of culling male chicks shortly after birth. Practices considered humane for chick culling include maceration and suffocation using carbon dioxide.

One of the main differences between a vegan, a lacto-vegetarian and an ovo-vegetarian diet is the avoidance of eggs. Although both vegans and lacto-vegetarians do not consume eggs, vegans also do not consume milk, unlike lacto-vegetarians.

== Comparison ==
Comparison of selected vegetarian and non-vegetarian diets
| | | Plants and seeds | Dairy | Eggs | Honey | Birds | Seafood and freshwater fish | All other animals |
|---|---|---|---|---|---|---|---|---|
| Vegetarianism | Lacto-ovo vegetarianism | Yes | Yes | Yes | Yes | No | No | No |
| Vegetarianism | Lacto vegetarianism | Yes | Yes | No | Yes | No | No | No |
| Vegetarianism | Ovo vegetarianism | Yes | No | Yes | Yes | No | No | No |
| Vegetarianism | Jain vegetarianism | Yes | Yes | No | No | No | No | No |
| Vegetarianism | Veganism | Yes | No | No | No | No | No | No |
| Non-vegetarianism | Flexitarianism | Yes | Yes | Yes | Yes | Sometimes | Sometimes | Sometimes |
| Non-vegetarianism | Pollotarianism | Yes | Maybe | Maybe | Yes | Yes | No | No |
| Non-vegetarianism | Pescetarianism | Yes | Maybe | Maybe | Yes | No | Yes | No |

== See also ==
- Lacto vegetarianism
- Lacto-ovo vegetarianism
- List of diets
- List of dairy products
- List of vegetable dishes
- List of vegetarian and vegan restaurants
- List of egg dishes
