= Lacto-ovo vegetarianism =

Vegetarian diet allowing eggs and dairy

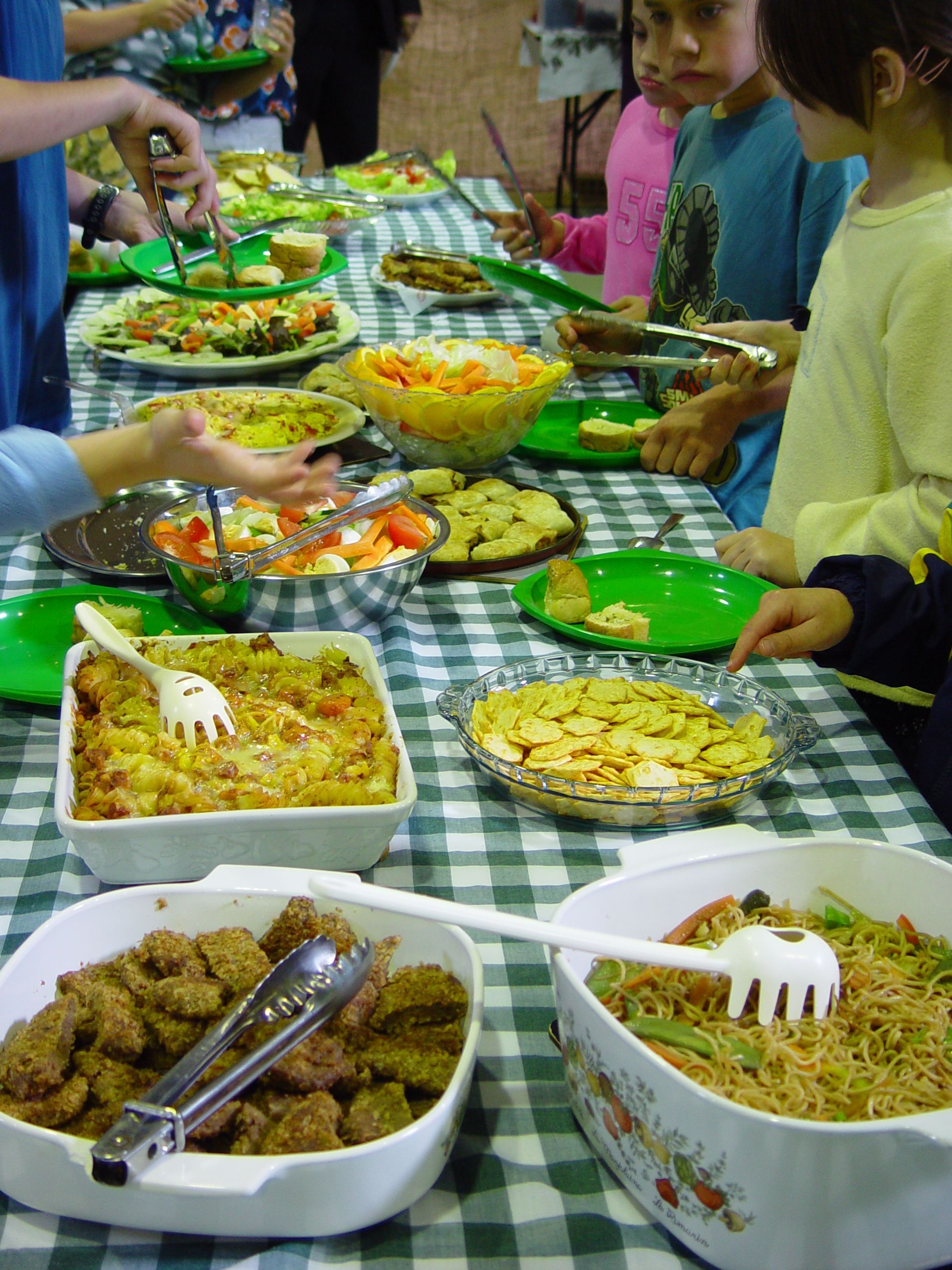
Vegetarian potluck

Lacto-ovo vegetarianism or ovo-lacto vegetarianism is a type of diet which forbids animal flesh but allows the consumption of animal products such as dairy, eggs and honey. Unlike pescetarianism, it does not include fish or other seafood. A typical ovo-lacto vegetarian diet may include fruits, vegetables, grains, legumes, meat substitutes, nuts, seeds, soy, cheese, milk, yogurt and eggs.

In most Western English-speaking countries, the word "vegetarian" usually refers to this type of vegetarianism; however this is not universally the case. In India, lacto-ovo vegetarians are known as "eggetarian" (a portmanteau of "egg" and "vegetarian"), as "vegetarianism" usually refers to lacto vegetarianism.

== Etymology ==
The terminology stems from the Latin lac meaning "milk" (as in 'lactation'), ovum meaning "egg", and the English term vegetarian, so as giving the definition of a vegetarian diet containing milk and eggs.

== Diet ==
Comparison of selected vegetarian and non-vegetarian diets
		Plants and seeds	Dairy	Eggs	Honey	Birds	Seafood and freshwater fish	All other animals
Vegetarianism	Lacto-ovo vegetarianism	Yes	Yes	Yes	Yes	No	No	No
Vegetarianism	Lacto vegetarianism	Yes	Yes	No	Yes	No	No	No
Vegetarianism	Ovo vegetarianism	Yes	No	Yes	Yes	No	No	No
Vegetarianism	Jain vegetarianism	Yes	Yes	No	No	No	No	No
Vegetarianism	Veganism	Yes	No	No	No	No	No	No
Non-vegetarianism	Flexitarianism	Yes	Yes	Yes	Yes	Sometimes	Sometimes	Sometimes
Non-vegetarianism	Pollotarianism	Yes	Maybe	Maybe	Yes	Yes	No	No
Non-vegetarianism	Pescetarianism	Yes	Maybe	Maybe	Yes	No	Yes	No

In the Western world, ovo-lacto vegetarians are the most common and most traditional type of vegetarian. Generally speaking, when one uses the term vegetarian, an ovo-lacto vegetarian is assumed.

== Religion ==
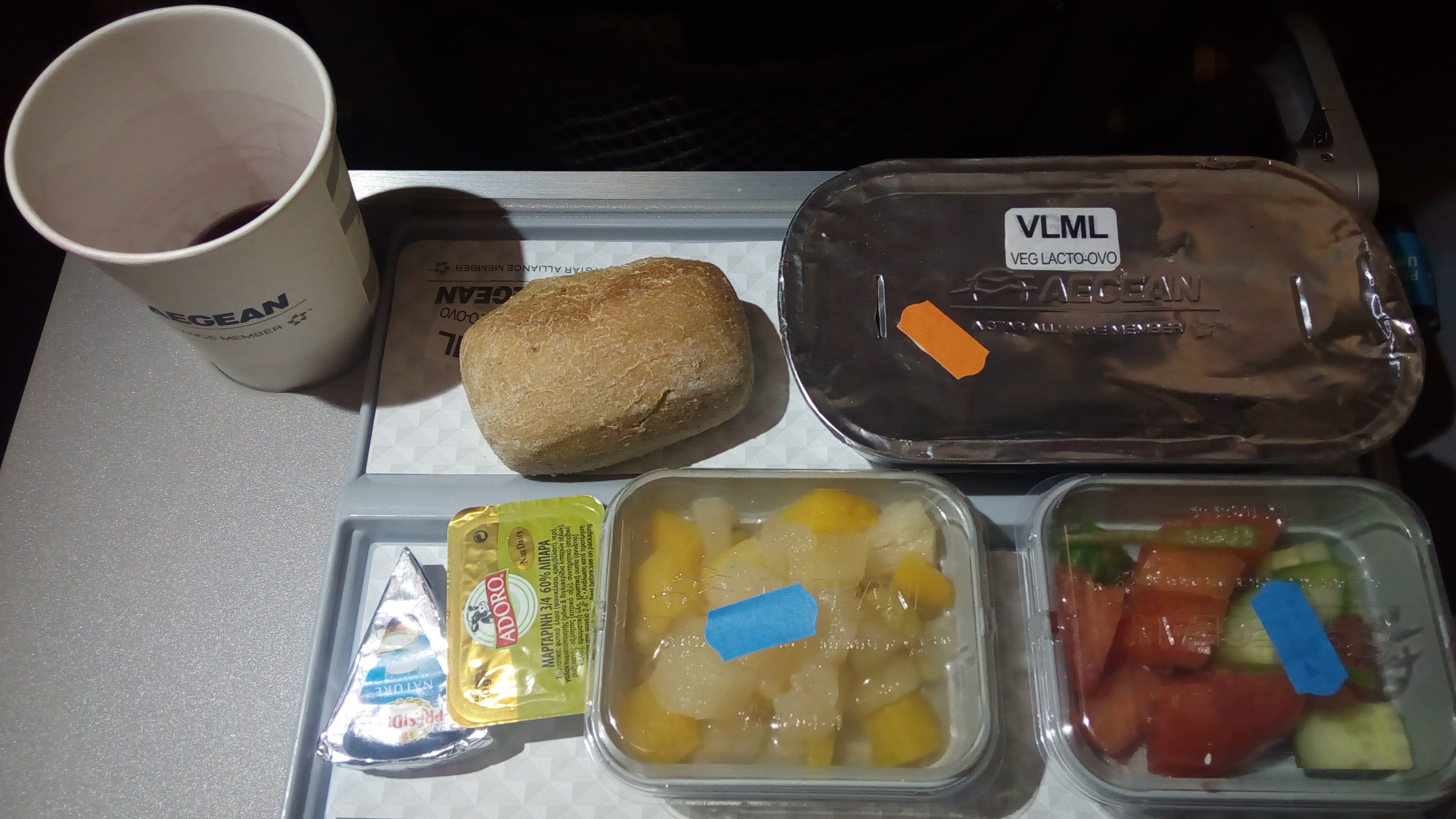
Aegean Airlines lacto-ovo vegetarian airline meal in 2018

In Indian religions such as Hinduism and Buddhism most individuals are either raised as ovo-lacto vegetarians or lacto vegetarians.

The Bible Christian Church was a Christian vegetarian sect founded by William Cowherd in 1809. Cowherd was one of the philosophical forerunners of the Vegetarian Society founded in 1847. The Bible Christian Church promoted the use of eggs, dairy and honey as God's given food per "the promised land flowing with milk and honey" (Exodus 3:8).

Many Seventh-day Adventists are ovo-lacto vegetarians and have recommended a vegetarian diet, which may include milk products, eggs and honey since late 19th century.

== Health effects ==
Lacto-ovo vegetarian diets have a high overall diet quality compared to non-vegetarian diets. Lacto-ovo vegetarian diets have positive effects on blood lipids such as lowering low-density lipoprotein and total cholesterol and are associated with a reduced risk of cancer and cardiovascular disease. The 2020-2025 Dietary Guidelines for Americans described a lacto-ovo vegetarian dietary pattern as one of several dietary options to promote health and prevent disease. The American Heart Association in a 2026 scientific statement on dietary guidance to improve cardiovascular health commented that a lacto-ovo vegetarian diet can support cardiovascular health and a healthy body weight.

There is high-quality evidence that lacto-ovo vegetarian diets reduce blood pressure. Lacto-ovo vegetarian diets are associated with an increased risk of iron deficiency.

== See also ==
- Lacto vegetarianism
- List of butter dishes
- List of cheese dishes
- List of dairy products
- List of diets
- List of egg dishes
- List of vegetable dishes
- List of vegetarian and vegan restaurants
- Ovo vegetarianism
- Pescetarianism
- Sentient foods
- Plant-based diet
