= Environmental impact of veganism =

Effect of vegan diets on the natural environment

A graph comparing greenhouse gas emissions per 100 grams of protein for various food products

The environmental impact of veganism refers to the environmental effects of a vegan diet, which is one that excludes animal products. Studies comparing dietary patterns have found lower greenhouse gas emissions and land use for vegan diets than for diets containing substantial amounts of animal products. Lower impacts have also been reported for eutrophication and biodiversity-related indicators.

The magnitude of the differences varies among studies and depends on the foods consumed, production methods, geographic location, and environmental indicator being measured. The environmental impact of individual plant foods also varies, and studies differ in their definitions of dietary patterns and in the methods used to estimate environmental impacts.

== Greenhouse gas emissions ==
Vegan diets generally have lower greenhouse gas emissions than diets containing substantial amounts of animal products. The difference is mainly associated with the higher emissions of many animal-derived foods, particularly ruminant meat and dairy products. Emissions from animal agriculture include methane from enteric fermentation, nitrous oxide from manure and fertilizer use, and carbon dioxide associated with land-use change and other parts of the production system.

A 2023 study published in Nature Food estimated the dietary environmental impacts of 55,504 people in the United Kingdom. The researchers linked dietary data from the participants with environmental data from 570 life-cycle assessments covering more than 38,000 farms in 119 countries. Dietary greenhouse gas emissions for vegans were estimated at 25.1% of those of high meat-eaters, defined as people consuming at least 100 g of meat per day. Methane emissions were 15.3 times higher among high meat-eaters than among vegans, while nitrous oxide emissions were 3.6 times higher.

The same study found a relationship between the amount of animal products consumed and environmental impacts. Diets containing less meat had lower estimated greenhouse gas emissions than diets containing more meat, with vegan diets having the lowest emissions among the dietary groups examined.

An earlier analysis by Poore and Nemecek combined environmental data from approximately 38,000 farms with information on food processing, transport, retail, and other stages of the food supply chain. They found substantial variation in greenhouse gas emissions between producers of the same food. Despite this variation, most plant-based foods in the analysis had lower emissions than most animal products.

Poore and Nemecek also modelled a global dietary scenario in which animal products were replaced with plant-based foods. They estimated that food-related greenhouse gas emissions would fall by about 6.6 billion tonnes of CO2 equivalent per year, or about 49%, in the resulting scenario. The model also assumed substantial reductions in agricultural land use, so the emissions result included effects associated with changes in land use as well as changes in food production.

A 2020 systematic review examined studies of dietary changes intended to reduce environmental impacts. The review included 18 studies and 412 measurements. Across the studies, vegan diets had a mean reduction in greenhouse gas emissions of 70.3% compared with the diets used as baselines in the individual studies, although the estimated reduction varied substantially between studies.

Plant foods have different greenhouse gas emissions depending on factors including agricultural practices, yields, land-use history, processing, and transport. Consequently, adopting a vegan diet does not result in a single fixed reduction in emissions. A diet based largely on foods with relatively low production emissions can have a different environmental impact from a vegan diet containing larger quantities of foods with higher emissions.

== Land use ==
Land use per 100 grams of protein for various food products

Vegan diets generally require less agricultural land than diets containing substantial amounts of animal products. Livestock production requires land for grazing and for growing animal feed. In a global analysis, livestock products provided 18% of food calories and 37% of protein while accounting for 83% of agricultural land use.

Poore and Nemecek estimated that replacing animal products with plant-based foods in their global scenario would reduce agricultural land use by about 3.1 billion hectares, or 76%. A 2023 study of dietary patterns in the United Kingdom similarly estimated that land use associated with vegan diets was 25.1% of that associated with high meat-eaters, defined as people consuming at least 100 g of meat per day.

The amount of land that could be released by dietary change depends on how the land is used afterwards. Some agricultural land could potentially be restored to natural ecosystems, while other land may have limited potential for restoration or may be unsuitable for growing crops. A reduction in agricultural land use does not necessarily correspond to an equivalent area of land being restored to natural ecosystems.

== Water use ==
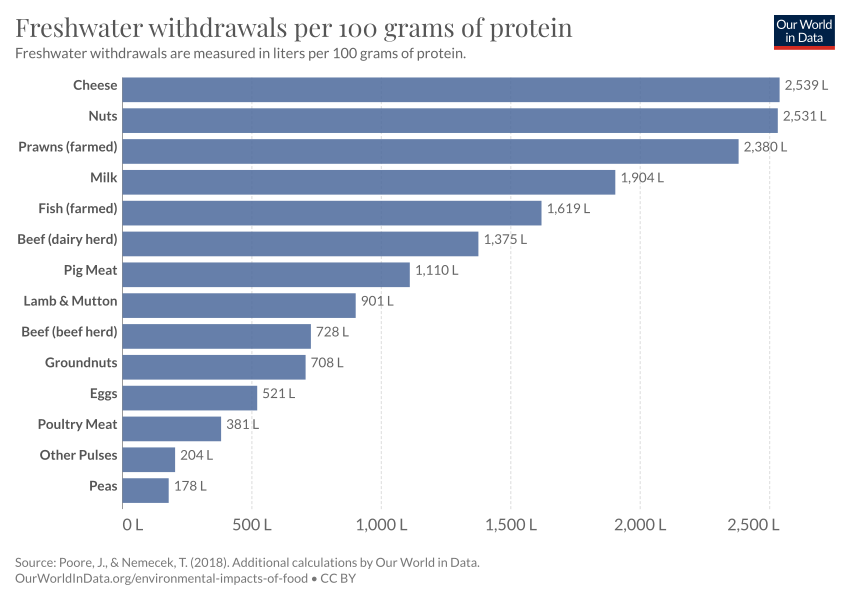
Freshwater withdrawals per 100g of protein

Water-use estimates show greater variation than emissions or land-use estimates due to strong dependence on local climate, irrigation practices, and the type of water footprint measured (blue, green, or grey water). The 2023 Nature Food study found that water use for vegan diets was 46.4% of high meat-eaters' use.

The 2025 menu modelling study found water use dropped by 7% from 10.2 cubic metres of water for the omnivorous Mediterranean diet to 9.5 cubic metres for the vegan diet. The Irish study estimated mean water usage at 104 L per person per day, with the potato-focused diet using the most water and the pescatarian diet using the least. However, the systematic review by Jarmul et al. (2020) noted that water use was frequently reported to be higher for some sustainable diets than current baseline diets. A 2025 US study found that although the vegan diet scored lowest across environmental indicators, the water required for plant-based protein nearly offset other water gains.

== Eutrophication and biodiversity ==
Eutrophication, the pollution of water bodies by nutrient runoff, was found to be 27.0% of high meat-eaters for vegan diets in the 2023 UK study. Biodiversity impact was 34.3% of high meat-eaters.

Habitat conversion for pasture and feed production, together with pollution from nutrient runoff and pesticide use, are among the principal drivers of biodiversity loss associated with animal agriculture. The 2018 Science study found that even the lowest-impact animal proteins have higher biodiversity impacts than plant-based alternatives. The 2025 modelling study found that all three plant-based menus showed reductions of more than 50% in key ecosystem impact indicators compared to the omnivorous baseline.

== See also ==
- Environmental vegetarianism
- Sustainable diet
- Vegan organic agriculture
- Plant-based diet
- IPCC Sixth Assessment Report
