= Environmental vegetarianism =

Type of practice of vegetarianism

All types of meat but especially lamb and beef generate several times more greenhouse gas emissions in their production than plant-based foods.

Environmental vegetarianism is the practice of vegetarianism that is motivated by the desire to create a sustainable diet, which avoids the negative environmental impact of meat production. Livestock as a whole is estimated to be responsible for around 15% of global greenhouse gas emissions. (Note: This is in line with the FAO's earlier estimate of 18%, published in Livestock's Long Shadow in 2006. They caution that "the two figures cannot be accurately compared, as reference periods and sources differ.") As a result, significant reduction in meat consumption has been advocated by, among others, the Intergovernmental Panel on Climate Change in their 2019 special report and as part of the 2017 World Scientists' Warning to Humanity.

Other than climate change, livestock production is a major contributor to biodiversity loss, deforestation, land and water use, and agricultural pollution.

== Environmental impact of animal products ==
Box plot showing average GHG emissions for different food types and ranges

According to FAO data for 2023, livestock emissions totaled about 4.3 billion tonnes of carbon-dioxide equivalent, making livestock the largest single component of global agrifood-system greenhouse-gas emissions.

According to the 2006 Food and Agriculture Organization of the United Nations (FAO) report Livestock's Long Shadow, animal agriculture contributes on a "massive scale" to global warming, air pollution, land degradation, energy use, deforestation, and biodiversity decline. The FAO report estimates that the livestock contributes about 18% of global GHG emissions expressed as 100-year CO_{2} equivalents. (Note: This is in line with the FAO's more recent figure of 14.5 percent. They caution that "the two figures cannot be accurately compared, as reference periods and sources differ.") This estimate was based on life-cycle analysis, including feed production, land use changes, etc., and used GWP (global warming potential) of 23 for methane and 296 for nitrous oxide, to convert emissions of these gases to 100-year CO_{2} equivalents. The FAO report concluded that "the livestock sector emerges as one of the top two or three most significant contributors to the most serious environmental problems, at every scale from local to global". The report found that livestock's contribution to greenhouse gas emissions was greater than that of the global transportation sector.

A 2009 study by the Worldwatch Institute argued that the FAO's report had underestimated impacts related to methane, land use and respiration, placing livestock at 51% of total global emissions.

=== Average greenhouse gas emissions per diet ===
Mean greenhouse gas emissions per 2,000 kcal by diet type
Diet	Mean dietary emissions (In kilograms of carbon dioxide equivalents)
All meat-eaters	5.93
High meat-eaters ( ≥ 100 g/day)	7.19
Medium meat-eaters (50–99 g/day)	5.63
Low meat-eaters ( < 50 g/day)	4.67
Fish-eaters	3.91
Vegetarians	3.81
Vegans	2.89

=== Land use ===
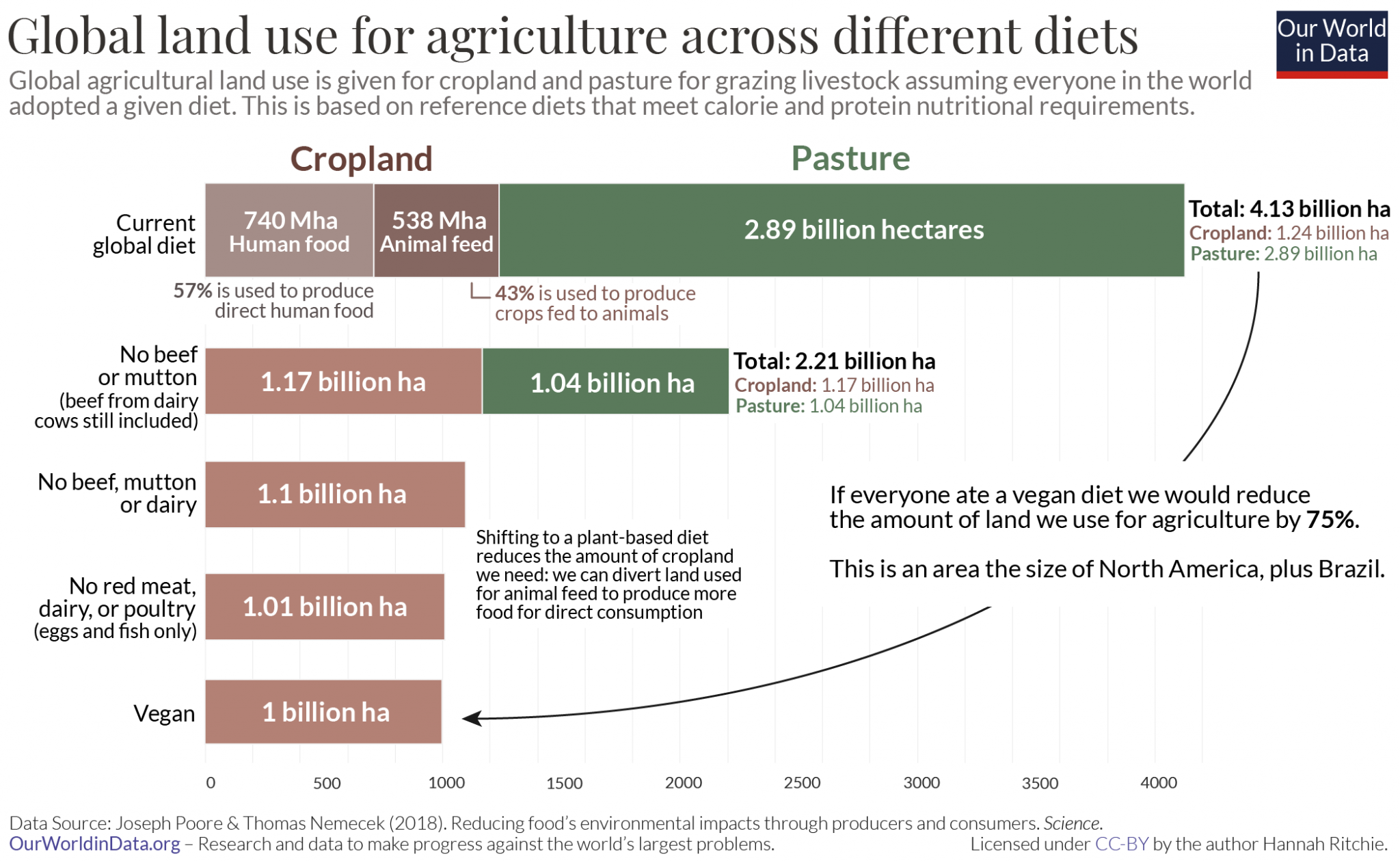
The amount of globally needed agricultural land would be reduced by almost half if no beef or mutton would be eaten.

A 2003 paper published in the American Journal of Clinical Nutrition, after calculating effects on energy, land, and water use, concluded that meat-based diets require more resources and are less sustainable than lacto-ovo vegetarian diets. "The water required for a meat-eating diet is twice as much needed for a 2,000-litre-a-day vegetarian diet".

=== Water ===
Animal production has a large impact on water pollution and usage. According to the Water Education Foundation, it takes 2,464 gallons of water to produce one pound of beef in California, whereas it takes only 25 gallons of water to produce one pound of wheat. Raising a large amount of livestock creates a massive amount of manure and urine, which can pollute natural resources by changing the pH of water, contaminates the air, and emits a major amount of gas that directly affects global warming. As most livestock are raised in small confined spaces to cut down on cost, this increases the problem of concentrated waste. Livestock in the United States produces 2.7 trillion pounds of manure each year, which is ten times more than what is produced by the entire U.S. population. There are issues with how animal waste is disposed, as some is used as fertilizer while some farmers create manure lagoons which store millions of gallons of animal waste which is extremely unsafe and detrimental to the environment.

== Relation to other arguments ==
Massive reductions in meat consumption in industrial nations will ease the health care burden while improving public health; declining livestock herds will take pressure off rangelands and grainlands, allowing the agricultural resource base to rejuvenate. As populations grow, lowering meat consumption worldwide will allow more efficient use of declining per capita land and water resources, while at the same time making grain more affordable to the world's chronically hungry.

— Worldwatch Institute, an independent environmental research institute

Although motivations frequently overlap, environmental vegetarians and vegans can be contrasted with those who are primarily motivated by concerns about animal welfare (one kind of ethical vegetarianism), health, or who avoid meat to save money or out of necessity (economic vegetarianism). Some also believe vegetarianism will improve global food security, or curb starvation.

=== Health ===
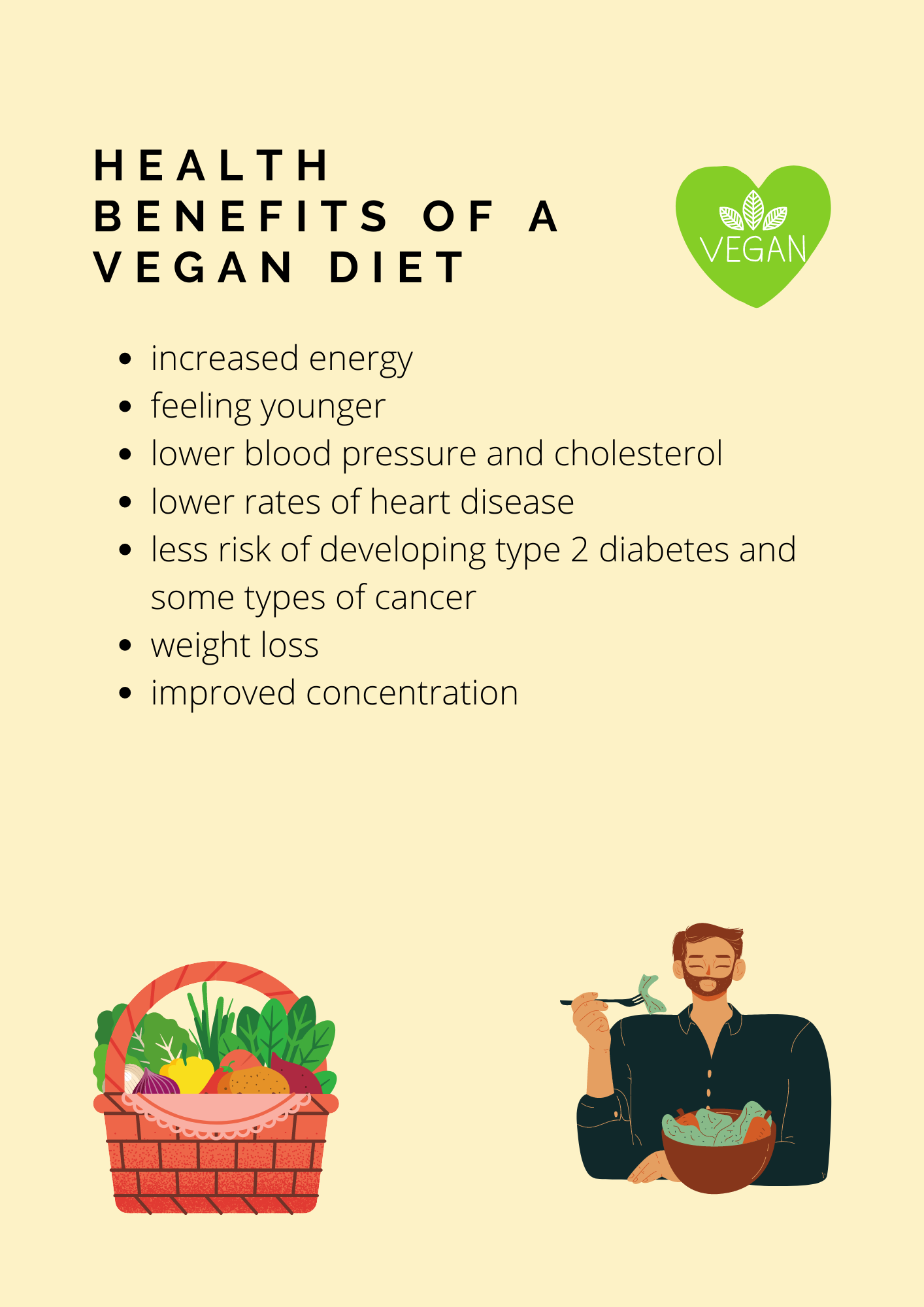
A small list of the benefits of a vegan/vegetarian diet on ones health

A 2018 report published in PNAS asserted that farmers in the United States could sustain more than twice as many people than they do currently if they abandoned rearing farm animals for human consumption and instead focused on growing plants.

For developed countries, a CAST report estimates an average of 2.6 pounds of grain feed per pound of beef carcass meat produced. For developing countries, the estimate is 0.3 pounds per pound. (Some very dissimilar figures are sometimes seen; the CAST report discusses common sources of error and discrepancies among such figures.) In 2007, US per capita beef consumption was 62.2 pounds per year, and US per capita meat (red meat plus fish plus poultry) consumption totaled 200.7 pounds (boneless trimmed weight basis).

== Support ==
People in developed countries consume a substantially larger proportion of meat than those in developing countries.

Globalization and modernization has resulted in Western consumer cultures spreading to countries like China and India, including meat-intensive diets which are supplanting traditional plant-based diets. Around 166 to more than 200 billion land and aquatic animals are consumed by a global population of over 7 billion annually, which philosopher and animal rights activist Steven Best argues is "completely unsustainable". A 2018 study published in Science states that meat consumption is set to increase by some 76% by 2050 as the result of human population growth and rising affluence, which will increase greenhouse gas emissions and further reduce biodiversity.

A 2018 report in Nature found that a significant reduction in meat consumption is necessary to mitigate climate change, especially as the population rises to a projected 10 billion in the coming decades. According to a 2019 report in The Lancet, global meat consumption needs to be reduced by 50 percent to mitigate for climate change.

In November 2017, 15,364 world scientists signed a Warning to Humanity calling for, among other things, drastically diminishing our per capita consumption of meat.

In November 2019, a warning on the "climate emergency" from over 11,000 scientists from over 100 countries said that "eating mostly plant-based foods while reducing the global consumption of animal products, especially ruminant livestock, can improve human health and significantly lower GHG emissions (including methane in the “Short-lived pollutants” step)." The warning also says it this will "free up croplands for growing much-needed human plant food instead of livestock feed, while releasing some grazing land to support natural climate solutions."

A 2020 study by researchers from the University of Michigan and Tulane University, which was commissioned by the Center for Biological Diversity, asserts that if the U.S. cut its meat consumption by half, it could result in diet-related GHG emissions being reduced by 35%, a decline of 1.6 billion tons.

A 2019 correction to a major 2018 study in Science of food's impact on the environment found that, after the negative emissions of land use change were accounted for, eliminating animal products from the food system would reduce total global greenhouse gas emissions from all sectors by 28%.

A 2018 study found that global adoption of plant-based diets would reduce agricultural land use by 76% (3.1 billion hectares, an area the size of Africa) and cut total global greenhouse gas emissions by 28%. Half of this emissions reduction came from avoided emissions from animal production including methane and nitrous oxide, and half from trees re-growing on abandoned farmlands that remove carbon dioxide from the air. The authors conclude that avoiding meat and dairy is the "single biggest way" to reduce one's impact on Earth.

The 2019 IPBES Global Assessment Report on Biodiversity and Ecosystem Services found that industrial agriculture and overfishing are the primary drivers of the extinction crisis, with the meat and dairy industries having a substantial impact. On 8 August 2019, the IPCC released a summary of the 2019 special report which asserted that a shift towards plant-based diets would help to mitigate and adapt to climate change.

A 2022 study found that for high-income nations alone 100 billion tons of carbon dioxide could be removed from the air by the end of the century through a shift to plant-based diets and re-wilding of farmlands. The researchers coined the term double climate dividend to describe the effect that re-wilding after a diet shift can have. But they note: "We don't have to be purist about this, even just cutting animal intake would be helpful. If half of the public in richer regions cut half the animal products in their diets, you're still talking about a massive opportunity in environmental outcomes and public health".

A 2023 study published in Nature Food found that a vegan diet vastly decreases the impact on the environment from food production, such as reducing emissions, water pollution and land use by 75%, reducing the destruction of wildlife by 66% and the usage of water by 54%.

== Criticism ==
In 2015, researches from Carnegie Mellon University claimed that environmental vegetarianism appears more harmful than helpful to our environment. Environmental vegetarianism actually takes more environmental costs, environmentally and financially, which backfires. Paul Fischbeck, Michelle Tom, and Chris Hendrickson, researchers in civil and environmental engineering at Carnegie Mellon University, investigated the impact of America's obesity crisis on the environment by analyzing the food supply chain's resource usage. The study offers a nuanced exploration into the environmental impact of dietary choices, specifically contrasting the perceived benefits of vegetarian and USDA-recommended "healthier" diets against their ecological footprints. The research underscores that while reducing overall calorie intake can decrease the environmental burden by around 9%, opting for diets heavy in fruits, vegetables, dairy, and seafood significantly increases resource demands—leading to a 38% rise in energy consumption, a 10% increase in water use, and a 6% uptick in greenhouse gas emissions.

In 2019, Loma Linda University School of Public Health published a research article which outlined that while, generally, vegetarian diet is more environmentally sustainable than omnivorous diet, its environmental benefits heavily depend on the specific foods included in the diet. This way, if beef is replaced by a larger quantity of dairy, the environmental benefit of such a switch may be close to zero. Similarly, if the vegetarian diet includes out-of-season fruits or vegetables cultivated in high-energy-consumption greenhouses, the GHG emissions offset could ultimately be reversed.

Evidence suggests that intensive livestock farming is a poor solution to world hunger, given its impact on personal health and the environment, but intensive industrialised farming of soya, maize and grains comes at a significant carbon cost, too – as does flying in the ingredients to keep berries and nut butters on acai bowls or avocado on toast.

== See also ==
- Cowspiracy
- Devour the Earth
- Diet for a New America
- Entomophagy (another environmental approach for obtaining food)
- Environmental pescetarianism
- Environmental veganism
- Ethics of vegetarianism
- Low-carbon diet
- Sustainable diet
- Vegan organic gardening
