= Economic vegetarianism =

Dietary perspective

An economic vegetarian is a person who practices vegetarianism from either the philosophical viewpoint that the consumption of meat is too expensive or as part of a conscious simple living strategy. In the developing world, people who might not be averse to eating meat are unable to because meat can be a luxury.

== Motivations ==
Economic vegetarians believe nutrition can be acquired just as, and even more, efficiently through plants than from meat at a reduced cost. They argue a vegetarian diet is rich in vitamins, dietary fiber, and complex carbohydrates, and carries with it fewer risks (such as heart disease, obesity, and bacterial infection) than consumption of by-products of animals. Consequently, they consider the production of meat economically unsound.

A high uptake of novel proteins (plant-based, fermentation-derived and cultivated products) would disrupt current food systems with both positive and negative impacts when it comes to safeguarding food security, jobs, livelihoods, social and gender equity and culture.

Some vegetarians are motivated by a lifestyle of simple living or adopt vegetarianism through necessity. For example, in the United Kingdom necessity changed dietary habits during the period around World War II and the early 1950s, as animal products were strictly rationed and allotment or home-grown fruit and vegetables were readily available. During World War I, Americans were encouraged to go one day of the week meatless in order to save meat rations for the troops, beginning the "Meatless Monday" revolution.

The relative cost of vegetarian diets varies by country, income level and the foods used to replace animal products. A 2021 modelling study covering 150 countries found that vegetarian and vegan dietary patterns could reduce food costs by roughly 20–30% compared with typical diets in high-income countries, while healthy and sustainable dietary patterns remained less affordable in many lower-income countries.

Food affordability can constrain dietary choice independently of personal preference. FAO estimates that the average global cost of a healthy diet reached 4.28 purchasing-power-parity dollars per person per day in 2025, and approximately 2.69 billion people were unable to afford such a diet. Food-group prices vary considerably by region; animal-source foods are among the more expensive components of healthy diets in many regions.

Economic discussions of reducing conventional animal-product consumption have increasingly included alternative proteins. These include plant-based meat and dairy substitutes, products made through fermentation, and cultivated meat. Their potential economic effects include changes in production costs, investment, employment and agricultural livelihoods, although cost, consumer acceptance and the ability to scale production remain important constraints.

== Economic effects of dietary shifts ==
Large-scale dietary changes can have economic effects beyond household food expenditure. A 2023 global modelling study found that shifts toward diets containing fewer animal-source foods could reduce total biomass production, food prices, international food trade, agricultural land use and food loss and waste. However, the study also found potential adverse effects for some low-income agricultural households whose incomes depend on food production, illustrating that lower consumer food prices do not necessarily improve affordability for all groups.

== Criticism ==
Critics of vegetarianism point towards the fact that many plant based foods lack nutrients such as Vitamin B12, Vitamin D, and iron. Unhealthy vegetarian diets poor in specific nutrients (vitamin B12, iron, zinc, and calcium) and/or rich in highly processed and refined foods increase morbidity and mortality.

== See also ==
- Balanced diet
- Environmental vegetarianism
- Simple living
- Sustainable diet
- Sustainable living
- Vegetarianism
- Zoonosis
