= Will Bonsall =

Author, (vegan) farmer, and seed collector

- Born: William A. Bonsall; July 28, 1949 (age 77); Waterville, Maine, U.S.
- Occupation: Author, (vegan) farmer, and seed collector
- Years active: Unknown–present
- Spouse: Molly Thorkildsen (m. 1978; div. 2021)

William A. Bonsall is an American author, seed saver and veganic farmer who lives in Maine. He is a regular speaker about seed saving, organic farming, and veganic farming.

Will Bonsall was born in Waterville, Maine, on July 18, 1949. He graduated from the University of Maine at Orono in 1971. After college, he moved to San Francisco and traveled extensively, including a hike across the United States and Mexico. He later returned to Maine to establish a homestead on 85 acres in Industry, Maine, which he named Khadighar Farm.

On November 5, 1978, Bonsall married Molly Thorkildsen at Khadighar Farm. Thorkildsen was born in Wisconsin on August 15, 1953, and the couple have two grown sons.

Bonsall is the founder of the Scatterseed Project and a frequent contributor to organic gardening publications. He regularly gives public talks on gardening, and shares plant-based recipes as part of his advocacy for self-reliant, vegan living.

In 2010, he self-published a science fiction novel, Through the Eyes of a Stranger (Yaro Tales).

== Will Bonsall's Essential Guide ==
In 2015, Chelsea Green published Will Bonsall’s Essential Guide to Radical, Self-reliant Gardening: Innovative Techniques for Growing Vegetables, Grains, and Perennial Food Crops with Minimal Fossil Fuel and Animal Inputs.

== Seed saving ==
In 1981, Bonsall founded the Scatterseed Project. In 1986, the Christian Science Monitor reported on Bonsall and his work saving seeds and saving heirloom crops. In the early 1990s Bonsall did help found Seed Savers Exchange in Iowa to preserve heirloom seeds and share seeds. Differences with Seed Savers Exchange later caused problems. Potato Grower reported: "The Seed Savers Exchange and Bonsall quit each other at roughly the same time, with the group no longer giving him what Torgrimson said was an annual stipend of between $13,000 and $15,000 to grow out his collection for them, and Bonsall no longer listing his vast collection of potatoes and seeds in the group’s annual yearbook. His mysterious absence from the pages of those books, and the possible cause of it, became a question bandied about on Seed Savers’ online forum throughout 2013."

In 2014, Bonsall founded the Grassroots Seed Network and the Portland Press Herald reported: "Nationally and even internationally, Bonsall is known as the curator of a collection of both rare and common potato varieties. The U.S. Department of Agriculture sends him potatoes it thinks might interest him. Someone in Norway might send him a few samples."

In 2016, Bonsall was featured in the documentary SEED: The Untold Story.

In 2020, Down East Magazine wrote: "Bonsall’s dispersal efforts have been so prolific that he often finds himself chasing his own tail. He’ll receive what he’s told is a rare variety of such-and-such, but in trying to trace it back to its original source, he’ll find it came from someone who got it from someone who got it from an old hippie in western Maine." DownEast Magazine later did report the article about Bonsall was the #1 most-read story of 2020.

In 2020, WCAI radio reporter Elspeth Hay reported: "Around 2013, Bonsall says his collections collapsed. He couldn’t get the funding or the labor he needed to keep growing so many thousands of seeds. He still has a lot—his potato collection for instance is down to 200 varieties—but remember it used to be 700, and for him, it’s a huge loss. He says he can get many of the seeds he had back—since he’s sent so many to other growers around the world. But he’s seventy. He doesn’t want to build up his collection again just to lose it—he wants to make it sustainable, to find a way to train young farmers and pass The Scatterseed Project on."

== Veganic farming ==
Bonsall is a vegan and a proponent of veganic farming, which does not use animal products such as manure. In 2015, Chelsea Green published Will Bonsall’s Essential Guide to Radical, Self-reliant Gardening: Innovative Techniques for Growing Vegetables, Grains, and Perennial Food Crops with Minimal Fossil Fuel and Animal Inputs. He writes articles about crops for farming publications.

Bonsall was quoted by The Guardian newspaper in 2019 as saying that - "We vegans like to put on our plates [vegetables] grown in methods that are very un-vegan." He said manure, blood meal and other animal products that are being used for agriculture are what is causing the vegetables to be un-vegan. In 2018, the Portland Press Herald vegan columnist Avery Yale Kamila reported: "Bonsall credits his “obsession with self-reliance,” interest in sustainable living, appreciation for organic farming, and an allergy to ruminant meat with propelling him toward vegan eating and farming. About five years after starting the farm in 1971, he began to question the conventional wisdom around obtaining fertilizer from animals."

In 2019, The Guardian said of Bonsall's farming: "Bonsall’s is one of just 50 or so veganic farms in the United States, according to research by Professor Mona Seymour of Loyola Marymount University."

In 2019, Bonsall shared his recipe for succotash with PBS program Kitchen Vignettes. Host Aube Giroux said: "For his version of this traditional Native American dish, Will uses four main ingredients grown on his farm: corn, red pepper, zucchini, and the star of the show: shell beans."

He has been described as a "vegan homesteader."

In 2020, Bonsall was interviewed by radio host Caryn Hartglass and he said that veganic farming is better than organic farming or permaculture farming because those systems "involve growing a lot of things from seed to an animal and then eat the animal. To me, that basically nullifies the main advantage of permaculture; not killing and all that kind of stuff. When you put that stuff through an animal then you loose so much of the efficiency of it, like 90% throwing away. I just don’t get it. I think there is something more organic than organic and I think there’s something more permaculture than permaculture. Those are the things I’m trying to aim at and discuss in a lot of my books."

== Vegetable claims ==
In 2019, The Guardian reported that Bonsall said most vegetables are "very un-vegan.” Bonsall has said he is one of the "few vegans in the world who actually eats a 100 percent plant-based diet" because he grows his own food and "can vouch that it’s animal-free."

== Personal life ==
In the mid-1970s, Will Bonsall had been homesteading in Maine when Molly Thorkildsen of Hartland, Wisconsin read about him in a magazine focused on homesteading and communes. Interested in interning and living in an intentional community, she reached out to him. Expecting a communal setting, she was surprised to find only Bonsall and his dog.

They married later that year, on November 5, 1978, on the farm in Industry, Maine, and collaborated on the farm for more than four decades.

In late 2021, while leading a composting workshop, Bonsall briefly mentioned that he was in the process of divorcing his wife of over 40 years, and noted that he was 72 years old at the time.

== Awards ==
In 2020, The Portland Press Herald awarded Bonsall the Source Seed Saver award. Portland Press Herald reporter Bob Keyes reported: "He has 1,100 varieties of peas and other legumes, including chickpeas, favas and runner beans. He has one of the largest Jerusalem artichoke seed collections in North America, and has more varieties of parsnip seeds than just about anybody anywhere."

== Selected works ==
- Will Bonsall’s Essential Guide to Radical, Self-reliant Gardening: Innovative Techniques for Growing Vegetables, Grains, and Perennial Food Crops with Minimal Fossil Fuel and Animal Inputs, 2015
- Through the Eyes of a Stranger (Yaro Tales), 2010

== See also ==
- Compost
- Fertilizer
- Human manure or "Night soil"
- Soil science
