= Sustainable diet =

Diet that contributes to the broader environmental and social sustainability

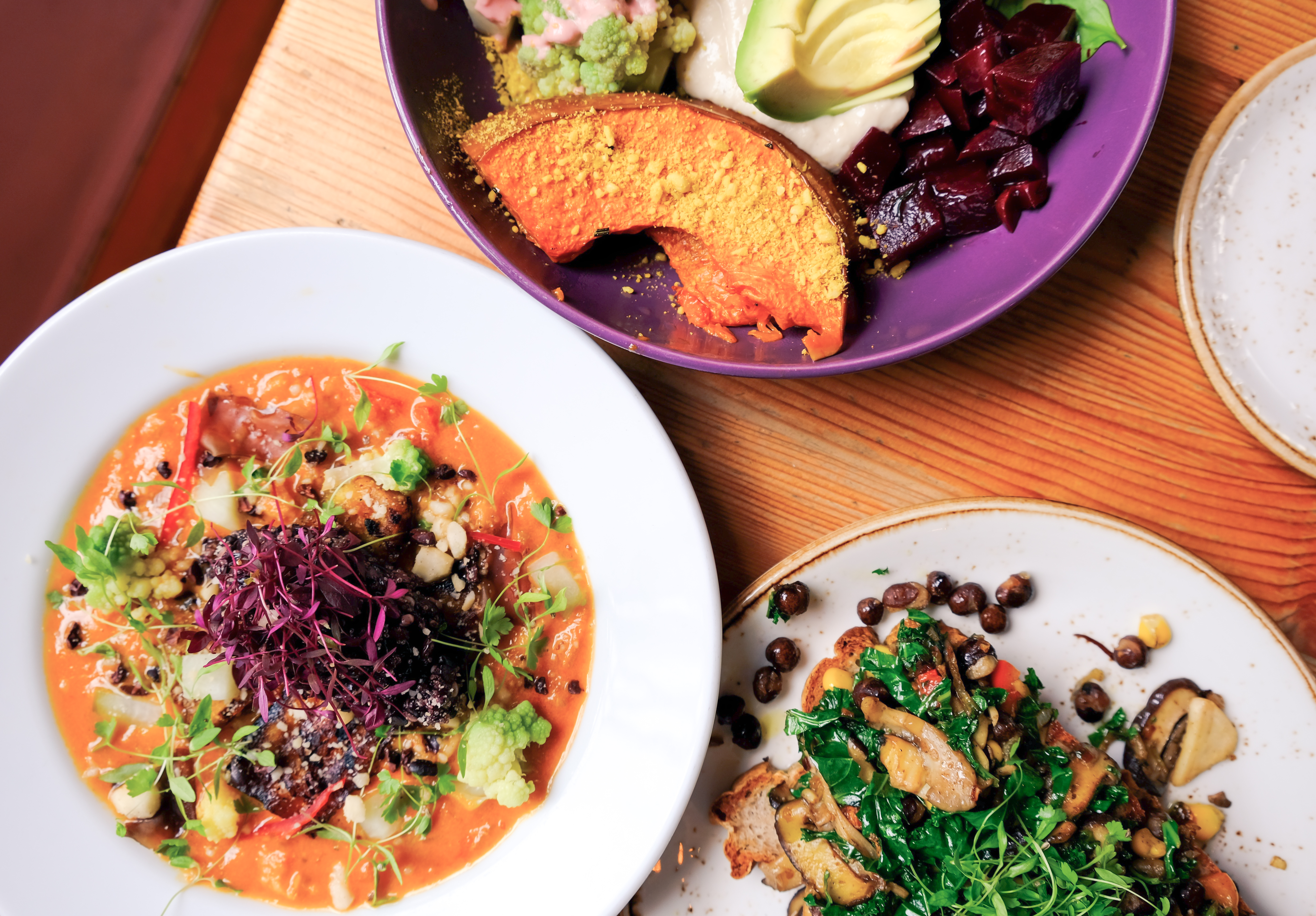
Plant-based diets are a popular way of eating a sustainable diet.

Sustainable diets are "dietary patterns that promote all dimensions of individuals' health and wellbeing; have low environmental pressure and impact; are accessible, affordable, safe and equitable; and are culturally acceptable". These diets are nutritious, lower environmental impact, economically sustainable, and accessible to people of various socioeconomic backgrounds. Sustainable diets attempt to address nutrient deficiencies (e.g., undernourishment) and excesses (e.g., obesity), while accounting for ecological phenomena such as climate change, loss of biodiversity and land degradation.

In order to create a sustainable diet, emphasis is placed on reducing the environmental cost incurred by food systems, including everything from production practices and distribution to the mitigation of food waste. At an individual level, most sustainable diets promote reduced consumption of meat and dairy products due to the particularly adverse environmental impact of these industries. Data on the intersection between food and sustainability has been prioritized by a variety of international bodies such as the United Nations Food and Agriculture Organization (FAO) and the World Health Organization (WHO).

== History ==
Sustainable diets were developed to address the dual issues of malnutrition and degradation of environmental resources. The term "sustainable diet" was first coined in the 1986 Dietary Guidelines for Sustainability article by Gussow and Clancy. They describe sustainable diets as "food choices that support life and health within natural system limits into the foreseeable future." The term and its usage was further refined in 2010 by FAO and Bioversity International. The FAO further delineated the constructs of practicing a sustainable diet to be the achievement of optimal growth and development, support for physical, mental, and functional wellbeing, prevention of malnutrition, and promotion of biodiversity and planetary health.

In 2014, the FAO/WHO Second International Conference on Nutrition placed sustainable diets and transformation of food systems as focuses of the UN Decade of Action on Nutrition 2016–2025. In 2019, the FAO and WHO collaborated once again to develop a set of guidelines for sustainable diets and their implementation worldwide.

== Components of a sustainable diet ==
The FAO and WHO have outlined the components of a sustainable, healthy diet. The outline divides these components into sections regarding health, environmental, and sociocultural aspects. Each component is also in line with current United Nations Sustainable Development Goals (SDG).

As a whole, sustainable diets emphasize:

- Starting early in life with breastfeeding and appropriate complementary feeding
- A great variety of unprocessed or minimally processed foods and drinks
- Emphasis on a plant-based diet: whole grains, legumes, nuts, fruits, and vegetables
- Including moderate amounts of eggs, dairy, poultry, fish, and especially limiting red meat
- Consuming primarily drinking water
- Providing adequate energy and nutrients, rather than not reaching or exceeding needs
- Staying consistent with WHO guidelines to reduce risk of diet-related NCDs
- Consuming minimal amounts of pathogens, toxins, and other disease agents through food
- Maintaining greenhouse gas emissions, land use, and chemical pollution targets
- Preserving biodiversity of crop, livestock, forest-derived foods, genetic resources, and more by avoiding over farming, over hunting, and over fishing
- Minimizing the use of antibiotics and hormones in food
- Minimizing the use of plastics and plastic derivatives in food packaging
- Reducing food loss and waste
- Respecting local culture, culinary practices, and consumption patterns
- Being accessible and desirable
- Avoiding adverse gender-related impacts, especially related to time allocation for buying or preparing food

=== Health ===
Building a sustainable diet can be analyzed throughout the human lifecycle. According to the United Nations this starts with infant breast feeding. With age, the diet becomes increasingly expanded. For children and adults, it includes a wide variety of minimally processed foods that are balanced across food groups. The most sustainable approach is a primarily plant-based diet, relying heavily on whole grains, legumes, fruits, and vegetables. This is also supplemented by moderate amounts of eggs, dairy, poultry, fish, and minimal red meat. Proportions are meant to be moderate, with all dietary needs satisfied but not heavily exceeded. Finally, a healthy sustainable diet includes safe and clean drinking water. The diet must also reduce the risk of non-communicable diseases and promote general wellbeing. Additionally, foods produced in line with a sustainable diet should minimize antibiotic and plastic use.

=== Environmental impact ===
In order to qualify as a sustainable diet using UN guidelines, a diet must keep greenhouse gas emissions, use of fertilizers, and pollution within established targets. Environmental sustainability also includes limiting land and freshwater use, preserving biodiversity, and reducing nitrogen and phosphorus inputs associated with food production. Sustainable diets are also intended to reduce food loss and waste and to minimize environmental impacts across food production and consumption.

Because environmental impacts occur across agricultural production, processing, transport, storage and consumption, assessments of sustainable diets may consider the food system as a whole rather than individual foods in isolation.

=== Sociocultural impact ===
An ideal sustainable diet takes into account local culture and culinary practices, including emphasis on locally sourced food products and regional food knowledge. The diet must also be accessible and affordable to all without disproportionately burdening one gender over another. This is a crucial part of claiming a sustainable diet. Many consumers do not realize the impacts of certain product production on surrounding communities. Sustainability includes ethical sourcing. A key aspect of sociocultural sustainability is managing and identifying product impacts on cultures, businesses, and employees.

=== Diets described as sustainable ===
Sustainable diets are typically associated with low-carbon diets, which are structured to combat global warming. The most important example of this is the Plant-based diet. Other approaches focus on broader environmental factors as well as social and economic challenges. For example, one strategy tied to region is the Mediterranean diet, a plant-based diet that is rich in fruits, vegetables, whole-grains, legumes, and fish.

Choosing plant-based proteins promotes health, reduces greenhouse gas emissions, and helps slow the rate of climate change. Examples of plant-based proteins include vegetables, fruits, whole grains, legumes, nuts, and seeds. Plant proteins are considered to have low biological value, meaning they are deficient in certain essential amino acids; however, taken together, their different amino acid profiles complement each other. This means it is possible to meet protein requirements on a vegetarian/vegan diet. Research shows these protein sources are low in saturated fats and high in antioxidants, which may help to prevent cancer and cardiovascular diseases. Additionally, the high content of fiber in plant-based proteins may help to regulate blood sugars. Therefore, choosing meat alternatives has the potential to support health for our bodies and the environment.

One common anecdote is that location-oriented sourcing is an important component for lowering the environmental footprint of food purchases. However, a very comprehensive study that gathered data across more than 38k farms recently showed that this is not the case. The carbon and net pollution footprints due to food transportation are almost always negligible compared with other pollutant sources during production. The only exception to this rule are avio-transported food items, which are niche products (e.g., most tropical fruits and nuts do not fly).

A 2020 study found that the climate change mitigation effects of shifting worldwide food production and consumption to plant-based diets, which are mainly composed of foods that require only a small fraction of the land and CO_{2} emissions required for meat and dairy, could offset CO_{2} emissions significantly. Data showed this difference is equal to the past 9 to 16 years of fossil fuel emissions in nations that they grouped into 4 types.

== Motivations for adopting a sustainable diet ==
=== Awareness ===
Awareness about the sustainable benefits of decreasing meat consumption observably increased between 2010 and 2014. A longitudinal study, taking place over the span of these four years, attributed perceived environmental impact to approximately 41% of individuals' explanatory reasoning for consuming less meat.

This study clearly indicated an increase in knowledge about the meat industry's environmental impact. When individuals were asked to comment on whether or not meat consumption is linked to climate change, the number of people who responded positively increased from previous records. Researchers described this increase as part of a "halo" effect. In other words, due to an increase in individuals' health consciousness, economic efficiency, and desire to eat more healthily, there was a resulting increase in their environmental awareness.

Decisions about food consumption have been found to hinge on health, naturalness, price, and sociability. All of these factors are associated with a reduction in meat consumption and increase in willingness to follow a plant based diet, with the exception of sociability. Individuals struggle to alter pre-established eating rituals in social settings out of concern for their public perception. They do not want to seem unsociable or difficult. These particular situations work as a barrier to adopting a more sustainable diet. However, because a positive environmental impact also aligns with an individual's health goals, expenses, and concerns, they are generally more likely to seek it out.

The longitudinal study revealed an increased awareness of the link between meat consumption and environmental impact as well as meat consumption and health outcomes. Emotion-focused coping may provide one explanation for the increase in environmental awareness that eating less meat supports sustainability goals. This concept states that defense mechanisms such as denial and rationalization may be mental strategies used to decrease negative emotions. As individuals begin to partake in more environmentally positive behaviors, regardless of motivation, they could alleviate their need for denial and rationalization in favor of comprehension and understanding that eating healthier is also more environmentally sustainable.

In June 2023, the European Commission's Scientific Advice Mechanism concluded in a review of all available scientific evidence that awareness and rational reflection are only a small part of consumers' decision-making process, and therefore that policies to promote sustainable diets should be applied across the whole food system, thus "unburdening the consumer".

=== Values ===
Motivation is defined as what individuals choose to do, how intensely they choose to do it, and the amount of time the behavior is maintained. This definition is not specific to environmental choices and food consumption but can be easily applied. Motivation and personal values are the backbone of environmental behavior and food choices. There are three main value types that are important for further exploration of the current topic: egoistic, altruistic, and biospheric.

Egoistic values are those built based on direct personal impact. Altruistic values are formed from an individual's relevance to others. Biospheric values are those that concern a person due to their impact on ecological systems, nonhuman animals, and plants. A combination of these values lead to the justification of choices, behaviors, and actions regarding food choice and its environmental impact. Choices affected and caused by the halo effect are due primarily to egoistic values and then extrapolated to encompass one or both of the other value types; originally, the choice was personally motivated but happened to blend over into a positive outcome aligning with a less self-focused intention.

Everyday, people are faced with an inundation of choices. It would be impossible to stop and thoroughly consider the options of each decision. Thus, heuristics were created. A heuristic is a mental shortcut employed to make quick decisions without using excess amounts of cognitive resources. They are used daily and often in food choice. Individuals know what they like to eat, but often make food choices mindlessly centered around these preferences. That is, food choices are not always a reflection of motivation or values. They cannot be guaranteed indicators of environmental awareness and health goals.

== In practice ==
=== "Less but Better" practice of meat consumption ===
The phrase "less but better" promotes a decrease in amount and increase in quality of meat. Quality, in this case, refers to the sustainable and responsible manner in which the livestock are raised. Another similar phrase is "less but more varied," which implies decreasing the consumption of meat while simultaneously increasing varied forms of protein such as nuts and soy. In practice, this might include the adoption of one meatless meal or day. Both of these phrases have been shown to affect consumer choices. When 1,083 consumers were given information regarding their current eating practices and suggestions for potential improvements via the implementation of these simple phrases, it was discovered that both sayings influenced overlapping consumer bases. In other words, both phrases were effective when implemented but not with all consumers, and each had slightly different affected groups.

The efficacy of "less but better" depends on the consumer's choice to eat or abstain from meat. Many individuals do not want to harm animals or see them suffer, but nevertheless choose to maintain meat-based diets. This situation has been dubbed "the meat paradox". Individuals cope with this cognitive dissonance often through ignorance (ignoring the known realities of their food source) or explanations loosely tied to taste. The psychological phenomenon intensifies if mind or human-like qualities of animals are explicitly mentioned.

"Less but better" is a concept also commonly used by gourmets. Gourmets are taste and quality oriented consumers. They are individuals who partake in gastronomy, which in simple terms is the practice of choosing, creating, and enjoying high quality food. This practice is typically, but not exclusively, dominated by men. These consumers have a high regard for the quality of their food and ingredients. They typically do research and search for what is in season and locally produced. Additionally, gourmets generally prefer meat that originates from grazing livestock rather than industrial farming techniques where animals are fed unnatural diets.

The regulations which gourmets place on themselves are inherently sustainable although they are not purposefully intended to be this way. They enjoy cooking and creating meals that only rely on plants alone due to the challenging nature of creating such meals at their standards. If they do choose to indulge and include meat in their dishes, they do so in small, high quality portions. These standards are not only creating the level of quality sought after by gourmets but are also aligning with sustainability efforts.

=== Sustainable diets and gender ===
Women are more likely than men to buy products labeled as being green, environmentally friendly, and sustainable. Stereotypes have informed rhetoric claiming green products are designed for women. This creates the illusion that sustainable behavior is inherently more feminine.

This arbitrary attribute of sustainable behavior has the potential to be shifted via improved packaging of green products. Redesigning for gender-neutral colors, art, and styles can make marketing more effective to a wider audience. Other genders may otherwise feel a product is off-putting due to perceived femininity. Working toward a greener future must be an inclusive community effort, made accessible to all.

=== Reactions and policy ===
Governments have been slow to adopt "sustainable diet" guidelines, with only a few publishing recommendations. Some industries, such as the meat alternative industry, have embraced these recommendations, while the Meat industry is actively lobbying against it. More generally, industrial food companies have not adopted "sustainable diet" as part of their Corporate sustainability strategies.

In July 2022, the European Commission asked its Scientific Advice Mechanism to deliver evidence-based recommendations for new policies to promote sustainable diets in Europe. The advice, delivered in June 2023, concluded that:

Until now, the main policy focus in the EU has been on providing consumers with more information. But this is not enough. People choose food not just through rational reflection, but also based on many other factors: food availability, habits and routines, emotional and impulsive reactions, and their financial and social situation. So we should consider ways to unburden the consumer and make sustainable, healthy food an easy and affordable choice. That will require a mix of incentives, information and binding policies governing all aspects of food production and distribution. Policies should address the whole food environment, anywhere where food is obtained, eaten, and discussed. The EU's food environment is diverse, including shops, restaurants, homes, schools and workplaces, as well as informal settings such as home-grown food. Increasingly, it also includes digital media.

== Challenges ==
=== Food consumption and environmental impact ===
Taste, health, and sustainability are three seemingly separate factors inherently linked by a common thread: environmental sustainability. A healthy diet is multifaceted Some may argue that sustainable diets are not feasible because they require meat to be cut out or tasteless to be incorporated. Both of these worries are misconceptions. In fact, there are groups of individuals who place the highest value on the taste and quality of their food over other aspects and have consequently created an incredibly sustainable diet. There are a variety of motivations, values, and influences that affect an individual's dietary choices.

In June 2023, the European Commission's Scientific Advice Mechanism published a detailed evidence review report which examined the barriers preventing consumers from adopting more sustainable and healthy diets in four respects:

- reducing consumption of meat and animal foods, and increasing consumption of plant-based foods
- reducing the consumption of unhealthy foods, i.e. those that are high in fat, salt and sugar, or ultra-processed
- increasing the consumption of organic foods
- reducing food waste at household level

The science advisors identified many such barriers, and grouped them broadly into:

- lack of motivation
- lack of capability
- lack of opportunity (including physical and social environment)

There is a current lack of awareness between meat consumption and climate change such that many individuals do not perceive there to be a link between the two concepts. Even when the two concepts are recognized as being connected in some way, individuals are highly skeptical of the extent. Many use their skepticism to convince themselves that the environmental impact is not worth a behavioral change.

People are reluctant to engage with the idea that their personal meat consumption has any role in the global context of climate change. They believe that their individual contribution will have little to no effect on the current state of affairs. Even believing that changing their individual behavior would, to a minimal degree, help alleviate the effects of climate change is highly contentious. Meaning, people view their own decrease in meat consumption as having little to no effect on climate change overall. With this belief being widely held, it may not be surprising that research has also shown reluctance and resistance to the decrease of meat consumption among individuals. Those who desire to act on climate change in a positive manner view behavior change outside of food consumption as more desirable and an action they are more willing to participate in. Reasons for this resistance include: the taste of meat is a pleasurable one, individuals perceive themselves as taking other steps towards sustainability and thus do not feel obligated to indulge in this act, and individuals are skeptical about meat production's link to climate change.

=== Sustainability of dietary recommendations ===
Nutrition facts are available on the packaging of nearly all food items sold at grocery stores. However, environmental information such as green-house gas emissions is not as easily accessible. A shift towards more plant-based diets could generate substantial public health gains. The human body is more efficient in transforming these food sources into calories and nutrients, adding to their overall health benefits.

Countries such as the Netherlands and Sweden have established sustainable diet guidelines for their citizens. Conversely, the United States of America has not officially established any such guidelines.

Healthier diets are associated with a reduction in greenhouse gas emissions. In fact, as compared with a typical American diet, a change to a healthy diet has the potential to reduce emissions up to fifteen percent. Potentially, even greater gains in emission reduction could occur if individuals change their diet with the purpose of sustainability. This would result in an emission reduction of up to twenty-seven percent. Neither of these dietary changes require individuals to completely cut out meat from their diets; although, a reduction in meat consumption is commonly required for individuals to meet dietary recommendations. In America, it is common for individuals to over-consume meat and protein without satisfying the other remaining categories. The largest change required by individuals is an adjustment to the amount of nutrients they currently consume in order to meet health recommendations in all nutrient categories

Germany is another country that currently lacks official guidelines for a sustainable diet. Research conducted in 2014 by Meier, Christen, Semier, Jahreis, Voget-Kleschin, Schrode, and Artmann analyzed the country's current lack of sustainable diets and how land usage can be adjusted to balance German-made with imported goods. The research also showed the potential for a reversal in the import/export pattern of the country such that Germany may export more goods than they currently import.

In June 2023, the Scientific Advice Mechanism to the European Commission recommended that countries should "generalise the inclusion of sustainability criteria in national dietary guidelines".

== See also ==
- Biodiversity and food
- Cultured meat
- Environmental impact of meat production
- Environmentalism
- Ethical eating
- Ethics of eating meat
- Forest gardening
- Jain diet
- Organic farming
- Organic food
- Organic gardening
- Planetary health diet
- Stock-free agriculture
- Sustainable agriculture
- Sustainable food system
- Vegan organic gardening
