= Federal Office for the Safety of Nuclear Waste Management =

- Bundesamt für die Sicherheit der Nuklearen Entsorgung (BASE)

Agency overview
- Formed: 1 January 2014
- Jurisdiction: Government of Germany
- Headquarters: Berlin (provisional)
- Employees: 450
- Agency executive: Christian Kühn, President
- Parent agency: Federal Ministry for the Environment, Nature Conservation, Nuclear Safety and Consumer Protection
- Website: base.bund.de

The Federal Office for the Safety of Nuclear Waste Management (BASE) is a legally established, independent German federal authority under the jurisdiction of the Federal Ministry for the Environment, Nature Conservation, Nuclear Safety and Consumer Protection (BMUV). It began its activities on 1 September 2014. Its headquarters (in 2014 declared as provisional) is Berlin. Other offices are located in Salzgitter and Bonn.

On 30 July 2016, the BASE got a new name: Bundesamt für kerntechnische Entsorgungssicherheit (BfE). At the same time, the BfE was assigned key tasks of the BfS (Bundesamt für Strahlenschutz, federal Office for Radiation Protection) in the field of nuclear safety and nuclear waste disposal safety.

For this reason, the main tasks of the BfE (now BASE) are carried out at its headquarters in Salzgitter, where most of its staff are also based. The president is Christian Kühn.

== History ==
After the nuclear phase-out of the Merkel/Westerwelle government, the governing parties, together with the opposition parties SPD and Greens, decided to pass a new law to search for a permanent repository. In May 2013, the four parliamentary groups introduced the Draft Act on the Search for and Selection of a Site for a Final Repository for Heat-Generating Radioactive Waste and on the Amendment of Other Laws (Site Selection Act – StandAG). This draft Article Act contained an Article 3 Act on the Establishment of a Federal Office for Nuclear Waste Management (German: Gesetz über die Errichtung eines Bundesamtes für kerntechnische Entsorgung, BfkEG) with only three paragraphs. In the course of the legislative process, Section 1 of the Act was supplemented and transitional provisions were added with Section 4. The BfkEG came into force on January 1, 2014, meaning that the Federal Office for Nuclear Waste Management was formally founded on that day.

Article 4, number 1 of the Act on the Reorganization of the Organizational Structure in the Area of Final Storage (NeuOrgG) renamed the authority the Federal Office for Nuclear Waste Management Safety (German: Bundesamt für kerntechnische Entsorgungssicherheit, BfE) on July 30, 2016. The reason for the renaming was the intention to more clearly distinguish from the Bundesgesellschaft für Endlagerung (BGE). At the same time, the BfE was given key tasks from the Federal Office for Radiation Protection in the field of nuclear safety and nuclear waste disposal safety. For this reason, the key tasks of the BfE (now BASE) are carried out at the Salzgitter headquarters, where a large part of the staff is also based.

From its founding in 2014 to 2016, the Federal Office was temporarily headed by Ewold Seeba, who later became the chairman and managing director of the BGZ Society for Interim Storage. On August 1, 2016, Wolfram König was appointed as the new president.

On January 1, 2020, the agency was renamed from Bundesamt für kerntechnische Entsorgungssicherheit (BfE) to Bundesamt für die Sicherheit der nuklearen Entsorgung (BASE).

Wolfram König retired at the end of January 2024. On February 15, 2024, Christian Kühn became President of the Federal Office.

== Organization ==
The Federal Office is under the supervision of the BMUV. It is headed by a president with a vice president as permanent representative. In addition to the presidential area, the BASE is divided into the following departments:

- Department Z: Central Services
- Department F: Research / International
- Department B: Participation
- Department A: Supervision
- Department G: Approval Procedures
- Department N: Nuclear Safety

The Participatory Administration Laboratory reports to the vice president. Its task is to develop innovative working methods in public administration and new participation processes between the state and society. As an innovation laboratory in the German administration, it is comparable to the BWI GmbH.

== Tasks ==
The Federal Office for the Safety of Nuclear Waste Management is the central federal authority for the approval, supervision and regulation in the areas of final and intermediate storage as well as for the handling and transport of radioactive waste. The range of tasks of the BASE can be described in more detail based on its organizational structure.

=== Nuclear safety ===
- Supervision of final storage facilities for heat-generating radioactive substances and the Asse II mine
- Receipt and publication of information according to Section 7 Paragraph 1c of the German Atomic Energy Act (AtG)
- Recording and documentation of all reportable events in nuclear facilities (Federal Incident Reporting Office)

=== Nuclear waste disposal safety ===
- Approval of the transport of nuclear fuels in accordance with Section 4 AtG (so-called Castor transports) and large sources in accordance with Section 186 of the German Radiation Protection Act, as well as their withdrawal or revocation
- State custody of nuclear fuels within the meaning of Section 5 AtG
- Approval of the storage of nuclear fuels outside of state custody (so-called intermediate storage) in accordance with Section 6 AtG, as well as their withdrawal or revocation
- Type approval of nuclear flasks of type C, B(U), B(M) and packages for fissile materials (CF, B(U)F, B(M)F, AF and IF)
- Recognition of foreign type approvals of nuclear flasks

=== Site selection procedure ===
- Determining exploration programs and test criteria in accordance with the StandAG
- Examining the proposals of the project sponsor in accordance with Section 14 Paragraph 2, Section 16 Paragraph 3 and Section 18 Paragraph 3 StandAG
- Supervision of the implementation of the site selection process according to Section 19 Paragraphs 1 to 4 StandAG
- Site security according to Section 21 StandAG
- Responsible for public participation in the site selection process

=== Approval and supervision of repositories ===
- Plan approval and approval of repositories for high-level radioactive waste (Section 9b AtG)
- Granting of mining permits and other required mining permits and approvals in approval procedures pursuant to Section 9b AtG for the construction, operation and decommissioning of federal facilities for the safekeeping and final storage pursuant to Section 9a Paragraph 3 AtG in consultation with the competent mining authority of the respective state
- Mining supervision according to Sections 69 to 74 of the Federal Mining Act on federal facilities for the safekeeping and final storage according to Section 9a Paragraph 3 AtG as well as the
- Issuing of water law permits or approvals in approval procedures according to Section 9b AtG for federal facilities for the safekeeping and final storage according to Section 9a Paragraph 3 AtG in consultation with the responsible water authority.

In addition, the BASE provides the BMUV with technical and scientific support within the scope of its responsibilities (Section 2 Paragraph 2 BfkEG) and in this respect carries out federal tasks which it is commissioned to carry out by the BMUV or, with its consent, by the supreme federal authority responsible for the subject matter (Section 2 Paragraph 3 BfkEG). Finally, the BASE is also responsible for sufficient research activities within the scope of its responsibilities (Section 2 Paragraph 4 BfkEG).

== Management ==
Since February 15, 2024, Christian Kühn has headed the Federal Office. His office is classified in salary group B 8 of the Federal Salary Scale B. He has the official title President.

== Criticism ==
Andreas Troge, former President of the German environmental agency, criticized the establishment of the agency with the previously envisaged powers in 2014 as an unnecessary duplicate organization to the Federal Office for Radiation protection.
