= Animal-free agriculture =

Farming without the use of animals or their products

Animal-free agriculture, also known as plant agriculture, plant-based agriculture, veganic agriculture, stockfree farming, plant farming or veganic farming, consists of farming methods that do not use animals or animal products.

Animal-free growers do not keep domesticated animals and do not use animal products such as farmed animal manures or animal parts (bone meal, blood meal, fish meal) to fertilize their crops. Emphasis is placed on using green manures and plant-based compost instead.

== Methods ==
Animal-free farming may use organic or non-organic farming methods. However, most detailed discussions of animal-free agriculture currently focus on animal-free organic variants. In the European Union, farmers have a financial incentive to use manure instead of animal-free fertilisers, since manure is subsidised. However, organic manure is not subsidised.

Industrial agriculture with synthetic fertilizers is animal-free. In the United States, few industrial farms use manure. Of all U.S. cropland, only 5% was manured in 2006.

=== Vegan organic farming ===
Vegan organic farming methods do not use animal products or by-products, such as blood meal, fish products, bone meal, feces, or other animal-origin matter because the production of these materials is viewed as either harming animals directly, or as associated with the exploitation and consequent suffering of animals. Some of these materials are by-products of animal husbandry, created during the process of cultivating animals for the production of meat, milk, skins, furs, entertainment, labor, or companionship. The sale of such by-products decreases expenses and increases profit for those engaged in animal husbandry and therefore helps support the animal husbandry industry, an outcome vegans find unacceptable.

Vegan organic growers maintain soil fertility using green manures, cover crops, green wastes, composted vegetable matter, and minerals. Some vegan gardeners may supplement this with human urine from vegans (which provides nitrogen) and 'humanure' from vegans, produced from compost toilets.

Veganic organic farmers take measures such as refraining from making large disturbances in the soil of the land and cultivating a variety of plants in the ground. This form of farming "encompasses a respect for the animals, the environment, and human health." Some of the plant-based techniques used in veganic agriculture include mulch, compost, chipped branched wood, crop rotation and others.

Farms certified as biocyclic vegan use preventative methods to manage insects. If these fail, however, the label allows them to use insecticides such as Bacillus thuringiensis, which starves larvae to death.

Vegan organic farming is much less common than organic farming. In 2019, there were 63 self-declared vegan organic farms in the United States, and 16,585 certified organic farms.

== Timeline ==
=== 2006 ===
- The World Conservation Union's Red List of Threatened Species reports that most of the world's threatened species are experiencing habitat loss as a result of livestock production conducted through animal agriculture.
- Center for Science in the Public Interest releases Six Arguments for a Greener Diet that found that a plant-rich diet "leads to much less food poisoning, water pollution, air pollution, global warming."

=== 2016 ===
- Research published in the journal Nature Communications finds that vegan diets have the best land use and are the only way to feed the global population by 2050.
- The World Resources Institute published the report: Shifting Diets for a Sustainable Food Future which showed that if people who consume large amounts of meat and dairy changed to diets with more plant-based meals could reduce agriculture's pressure on the environment.

=== 2017 ===
- University of Edinburgh researchers find that animal farming is the leading cause of food waste as it is responsible for the most losses of all harvested crops on Earth (40%) due to secondary consumption.
- Forbes magazine publishes a compilation of recent vegan and plant-based business successes noting that vegan living is becoming more a norm because of its positive impact on sustainability.

=== 2018 ===
- Research published in the Proceedings of the National Academy of Sciences find that a vegan shift would increase the US food supply by a third, eliminating all of the losses due to food waste and feeding all Americans as well as roughly 390,000,000 more.
- A Harvard study found that shifting all beef production in the U.S. to pastured, grass-fed systems would require 30% more cattle, increase beef's methane emissions by 43%, and would require much more land than is available.

=== 2019 ===
- A report from the Humane Party determines that vegan-organic agriculture can be 4,198% more productive than animal-based agriculture in the amount of food produced per acre.
- Veganic farmer Will Bonsall told The Guardian that most vegetables are "very un-vegan" due to being grown using inputs of animal-based products.

== Advantages ==
Livestock in the United States produce 230,000 pounds of manure per second, and nitrogen from these wastes is converted into ammonia and nitrates which leach into ground and surface water causing contamination of wells, rivers and streams. Mature compost of plant-based origins, used in animal-free agriculture, can reduce leaching of nitrate which leads to an improvement in groundwater quality and counteracts the eutrophication of surface waters.

Animal free agriculture has the potential to prevent illnesses like influenza from spreading. Experts agree that most strains of the influenza virus that infect human beings came from contact with other animals. Farm animals on factory farms may be genetically similar therefore making them more susceptible to specific parasites. Infection among animals is more easily spread because of their close proximity to one another. Animal-free agriculture does not contribute to the spread of influenza through animals.

== Current use ==
Vegan France Interpro in collaboration with the Biocyclic Vegan Network created an interactive map that lists all-vegan organic projects across Europe. This list primarily includes agricultural operations but also trading and processing companies, online shops, network organizations as well as certification bodies that certify farms according to the Biocyclic Vegan Standard.

There is a similar map in North America that conducts the same concept and locates vegan farms around North America.

The Biocyclic Vegan Standard is an IFOAM-accredited organic standard for vegan organic farms. It is awarded by BNS Biocyclic Network Services Ltd (a Cypriot company), and has accredited 19 farms in Europe as of June 2021. The German Environment Agency awarded the German biocyclic vegan association some 60,000 euros for the promotion of the biocyclic vegan standard from 2021 to 2022.

As of June 2021, 18 farms in the United Kingdom and Ireland are certified vegan organic by the Stockfree Organic label. Farms wanting to obtain the label are certified by the Soil Association, and the label's requirements are determined by the Vegan Organic Network.

== See also ==
- Forest gardening
- Livestock's Long Shadow
- Vegan organic agriculture
