= Low-carbon diet =

Diet to reduce greenhouse gas emissions

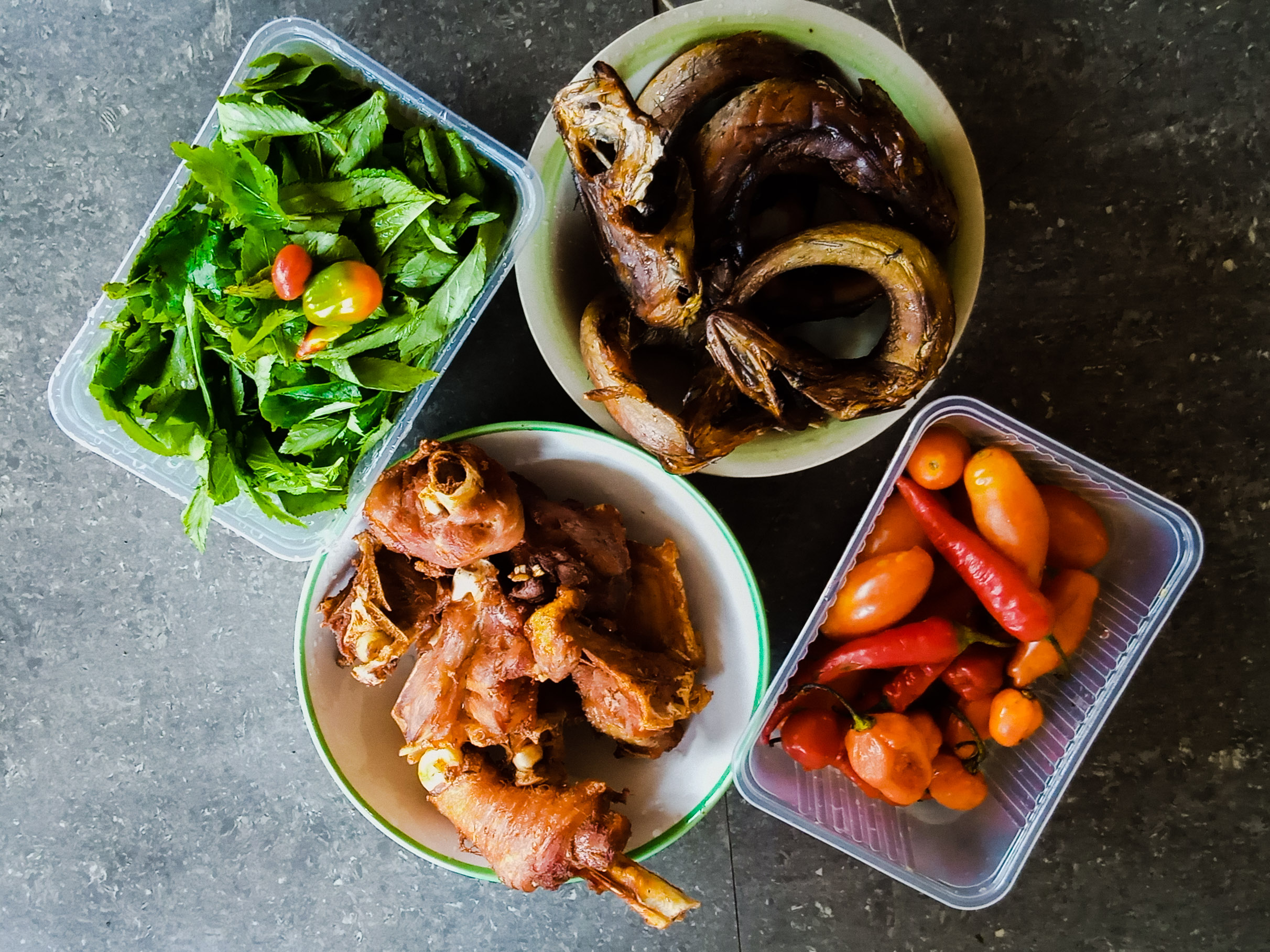
Vegetables are low-carbon compared to meats.

A low-carbon diet is any diet that results in lower greenhouse gas emissions. Choosing a low carbon diet is one facet of developing sustainable diets which increase the long-term sustainability of humanity. Major tenets of a low-carbon diet include eating a plant-based diet, and in particular little or no beef and dairy. Low-carbon diets differ around the world in taste, style, and the frequency they are eaten. Asian countries like India and China feature vegetarian and vegan meals as staples in their diets. In contrast, Europe and North America rely on animal products for their Western diets.

It is estimated that the food system is responsible for a quarter to a third of human-caused greenhouse gas emissions. More fossil fuels are required for the production of animal-based foods like meat and dairy and have a higher carbon footprint. Large amounts of land are required to raise livestock for beef and dairy products and methane emissions from cattle contribute to the greenhouse gases in the atmosphere. However, carbon emissions from transportation and packaging for plant-based diets are similar in scale to animal-based diets. Local production can be much more energy intensive and inefficient compared to industrialized production.

== Overall trends worldwide ==
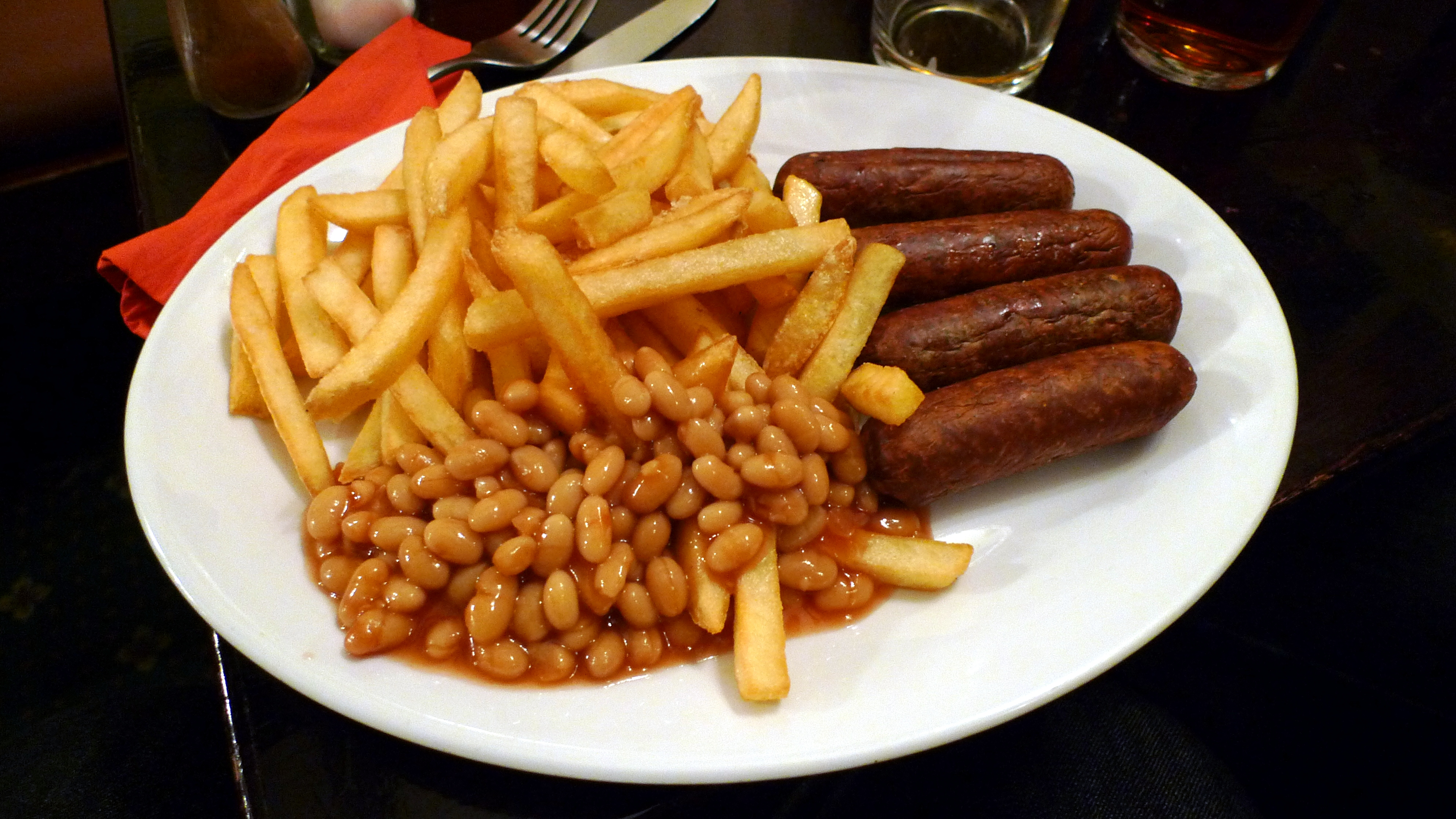
Meal with vegetarian sausages at a pub in London, UK

A 2014 study into the real-life diets of British people estimated their greenhouse gas footprints in terms of kilograms of carbon dioxide equivalent per day:

- 7.19 for high meat-eaters (≥100 g/day)
- 5.63 for medium meat-eaters (50–99 g/day)
- 4.67 for low meat-eaters (<50 g/day)
- 3.91 for fish-eaters
- 3.81 for vegetarians
- 2.89 for vegans

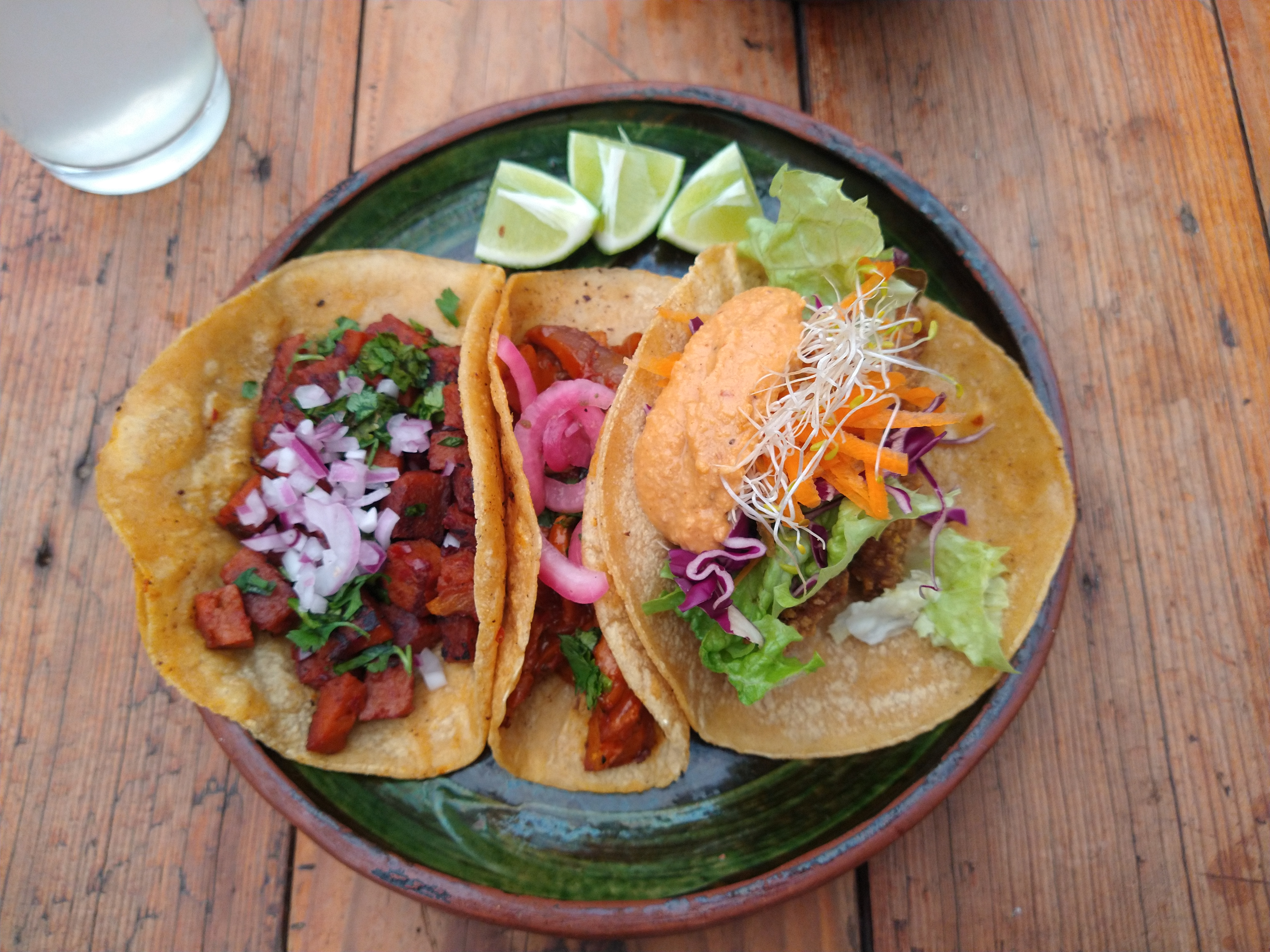
Vegan tacos from Mexico

While the fish-eaters had the lowest footprints out of all the meat-eaters, the vegetarians and vegans were the lowest overall. This is due to the contribution of greenhouse gases in the growth, processing, production, and transport of the plant-based food products eaten by vegetarians and vegans.

A 2020 study found that Asia has the largest percentage of vegetarians at 19%. Close behind Asia is Africa/the Middle East with 16%. South and Central America have just 8% and North America has a mere 6%. This study found that Europe has the smallest percentage of vegetarians at only 5%. There was not conclusive data on the percentage of vegetarians in Australia.

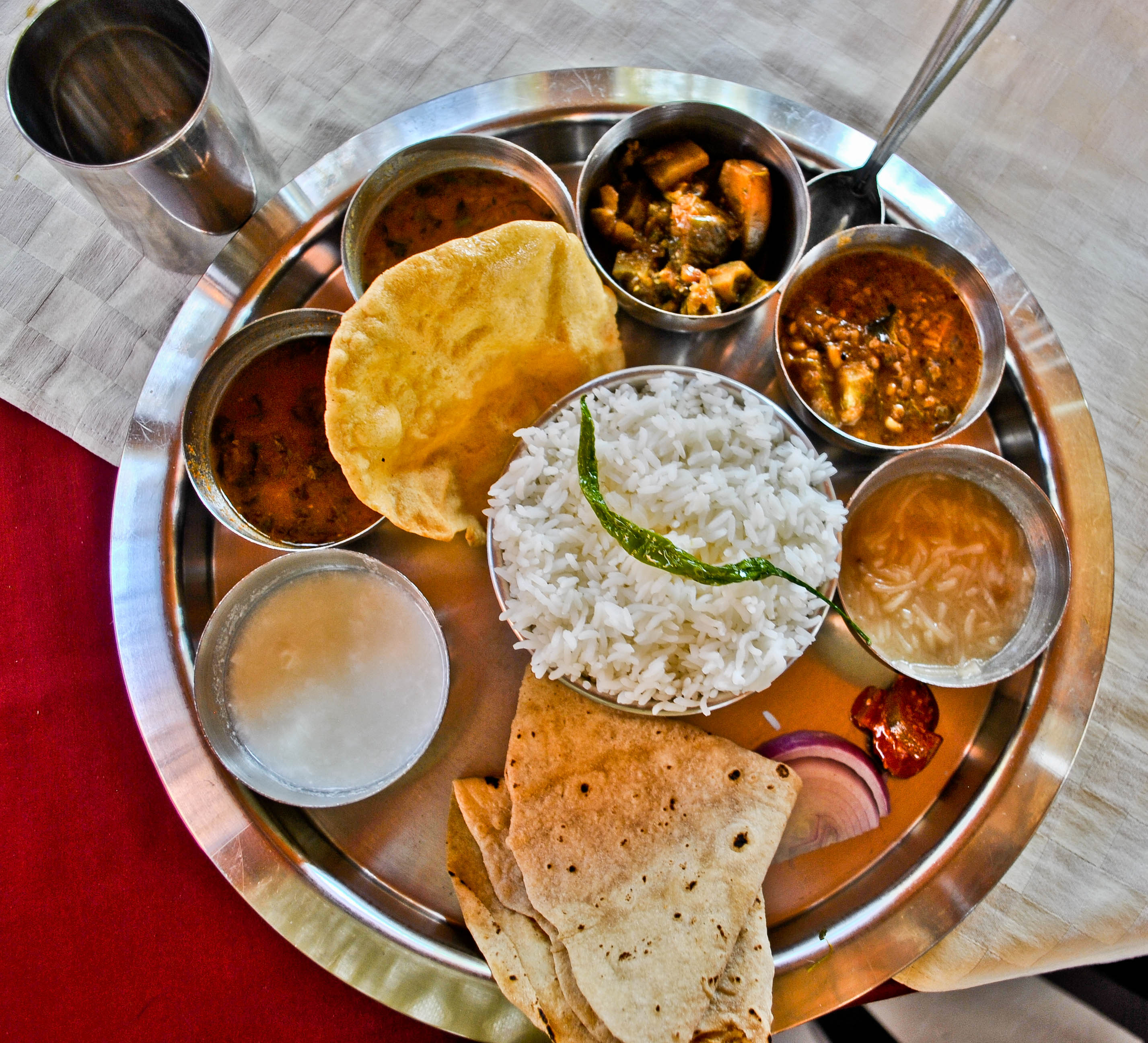
Vegetarian thali (plate) from India

Non-Western diets are built around unprocessed starches. In South America and Africa, the centerpiece of each meal is beans and grains. Peru, in South America, has potatoes as the foundation for their diet. In Asia, rice is a staple in every household no matter the income level. Meat is usually the centerpiece of meals in the Western diet, whereas animal products are often small parts of the meal (or act as condiments) in the non-Western diet.

In India, the practice of the vegetarian diet is usually generational and simply follows the pattern expected of the family. Adherence can also be credited to certain religious groups and social groups. For example, Hindus do not eat beef because they believe that red meat from cattle is impure. Some of the vegetarian staples consumed are a mixture of whole grains along with nuts/seeds and legumes. Dairy is also included in the Indian vegetarian diet, with unique spices and seasonings per region. However, certain populations in India have begun eating meat due to the growing popularity of western diets.

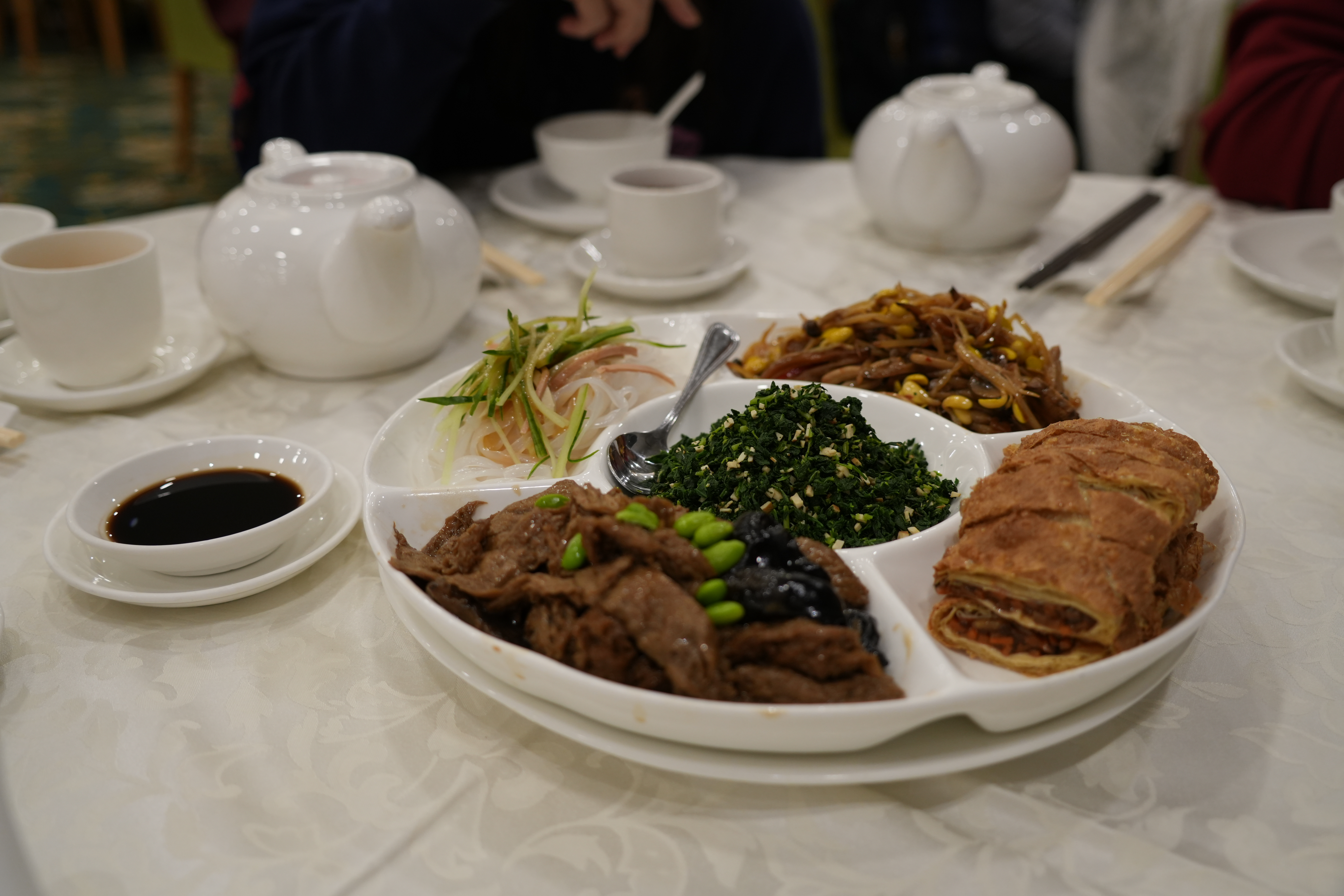
Classic vegetarian dish from China

== Background on diet and greenhouse gas emissions ==
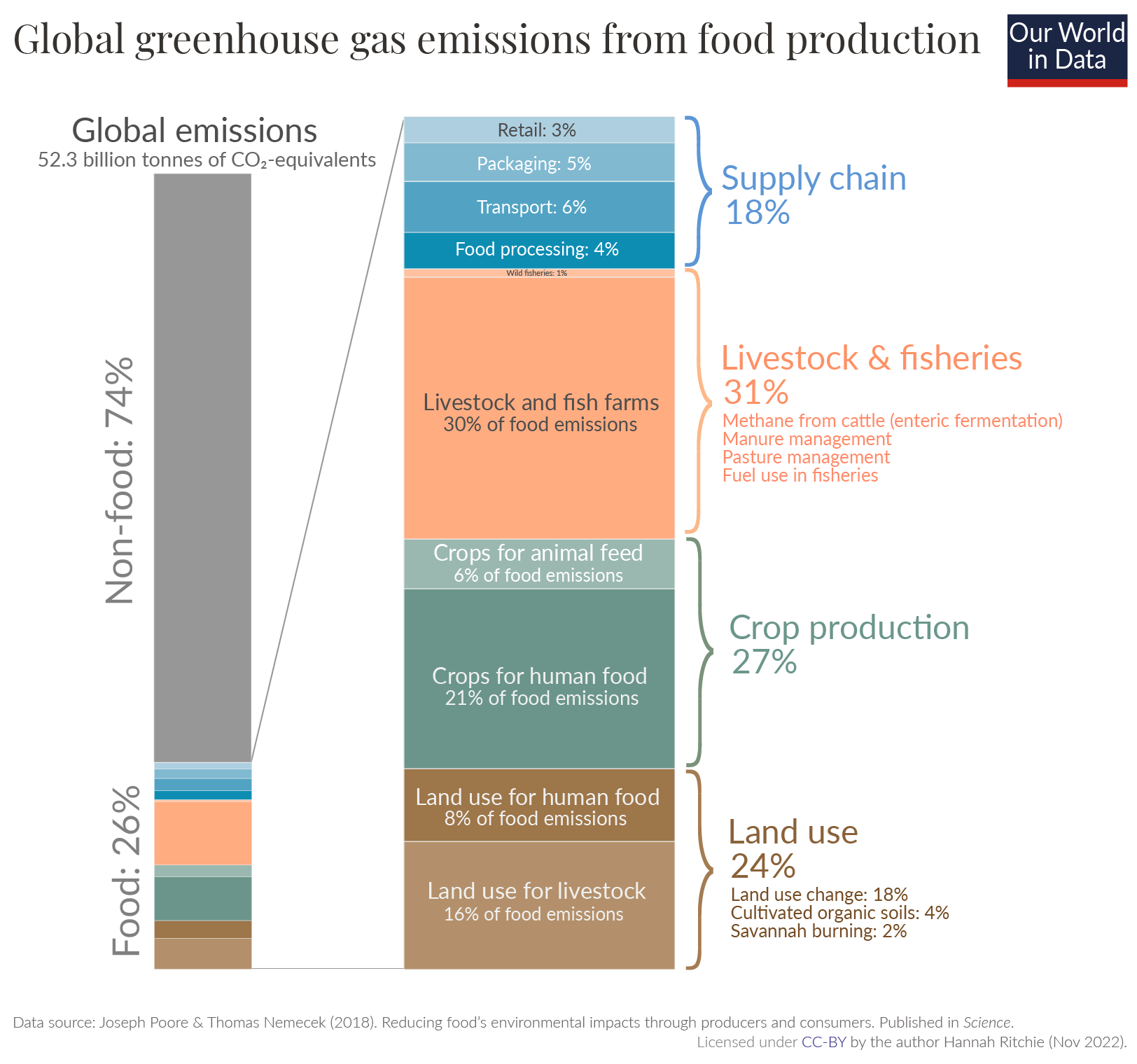
Global greenhouse gas emissions from food production.

In the U.S., the food system emits four of the greenhouse gases associated with climate change: carbon dioxide (CO_{2}), methane, nitrous oxide and chlorofluorocarbons. The burning of fossil fuels (such as oil and gasoline) to power vehicles that transport food for long distances by air, ship, truck and rail releases carbon dioxide, the primary gas responsible for global warming. Chlorofluorocarbons (CFCs) are emitted from mechanical refrigerating and freezing mechanisms – both staples in food shipment and storage. Anthropogenic methane emission sources include agriculture (ruminants, manure management, wetland rice production), various other industries and landfills. Anthropogenic nitrous oxide sources include fertilizer, manure, crop residues and nitrogen-fixing crops production. Methane and nitrous oxide are also emitted in large amounts from natural sources. The 100-year global warming potentials of methane and nitrous oxide are recently estimated at 25 and 298 carbon dioxide equivalents, respectively.

Steinfeld et al. estimate that livestock production accounts for 18 percent of anthropogenic GHG emissions expressed as carbon dioxide equivalents. Of this amount, 34 percent is carbon dioxide emission from deforestation, principally in Central and South America, that they assigned to livestock production. However, deforestation associated with livestock production is not an issue in many regions. In the US, the land area occupied by forest increased between 1990 and 2009 and a net increase in forest land area was also reported in Canada.

Of emissions they attribute to livestock production, Steinfeld et al. estimate that globally, methane accounts for 30.2 percent. Like other greenhouse gases, methane contributes to global warming when its atmospheric concentration rises. Although methane emission from agriculture and other anthropogenic sources has contributed substantially to past warming, it is of much less significance for current and recent warming. This is because there has been relatively little increase in atmospheric methane concentration in recent years The anomalous increase in methane concentration in 2007, discussed by Rigby et al., has since been attributed principally to anomalous methane flux from natural wetlands, mostly in the tropics, rather than to anthropogenic sources.

Livestock sources (including enteric fermentation and manure) account for about 3.1 percent of US anthropogenic GHG emissions expressed as carbon dioxide equivalents. This EPA estimate is based on methodologies agreed to by the Conference of Parties of the UNFCCC, with 100-year global warming potentials from the IPCC Second Assessment Report used in estimating GHG emissions as carbon dioxide equivalents.

A 2016 study published in Nature Climate Change concludes that climate taxes on meat and milk would simultaneously produce substantial cuts in greenhouse gas emissions and lead to healthier diets. Such taxes would need to be designed with care: exempting and subsidising some food groups, selectively compensating for income loss, and using part of the revenue for health promotion. The study analyzed surcharges of 40% on beef and 20% on milk and their effects on consumption, climate emissions, and distribution. An optimum plan would reduce emissions by 1 billion tonnes per year – similar in amount to those from aviation globally.

== High-carbon and low-carbon food choices ==
Greenhouse impact across food categories: results from a 2017 review of 389 life-cycle assessments

Certain foods require more fossil fuel inputs than others. Animal-based foods like meat and dairy have a much higher carbon footprint than plant-based foods. Therefore, it is possible to go on a low-carbon diet and reduce one's carbon footprint by choosing foods that need less fossil fuel and therefore emit less carbon dioxide and other greenhouse gases. Further research finds that even "the lowest-impact animal products typically exceed those of vegetable substitutes". For example, Ritchie explains that "producing 100 grams of protein from peas emits just 0.4 kilograms of carbon dioxide equivalents (CO2eq). To get the same amount of protein from beef, emissions would be nearly 90 times higher, at 35 kgCO2eq."

In June 2010, a report from United Nations Environment Programme declared that a global shift towards a vegan diet was needed to save the world from hunger, fuel shortages and climate change. This will mean a huge shift in the diet of the average European, as 83% of their diets are made up of meat, dairy, and eggs. As a major contributor to global carbon emissions, China introduced new dietary guidelines in 2016 which aim to cut meat consumption by 50% and thereby reduce greenhouse gas emissions by 1 billion tonnes by 2030.

More families are choosing to implement vegan and vegetarian diets for adults and children alike. Cundiff and Harris write: "The American Dietetic Association (ADA) and Dietitians of Canada position paper officially recognizes that well-planned vegan and other vegetarian diets are appropriate for infancy and childhood." However, European recommendations for children's diets do not include the vegan diet. They stand that there should be necessary "medical and dietetic supervision" in order for the safety of the vegan child to be kept in mind. It has been noted that "the more restrictive the diet and the younger the child, the greater the risk of nutritional deficiency." The most common nutrients left out of the vegan child's diet are as follows:

- Protein (quality and quantity)
- Iron
- Zinc
- Selenium
- Calcium
- Riboflavin
- Vitamins A, D, and B_{12}
- Essential fatty acids

== Industrial versus pastured livestock ==
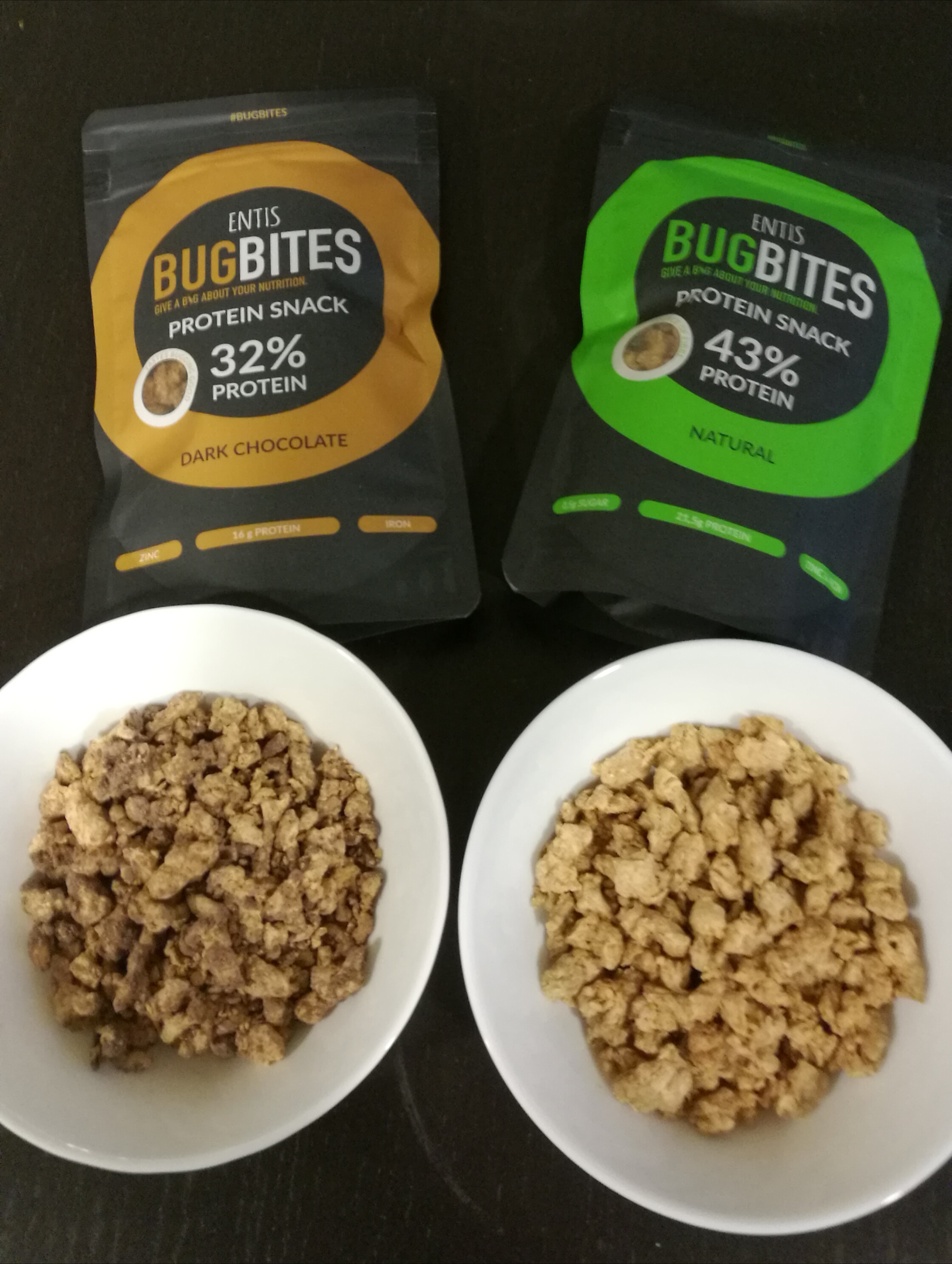
Insect food snack product. Insects could be an alternative protein source with a lower carbon footprint compared to animal-based protein.

Beef and dairy cattle have extremely high levels of greenhouse gas emissions, due to methane emissions from enteric fermentation, and their very large land footprint. Feed is a significant contributor to emissions from animals raised in Confined Animal Feeding Operations (CAFOs) or factory farms, as corn or soybeans must be fertilized, irrigated, processed into animal feed, packaged and then transported to the CAFO. In 2005, CAFOs accounted for 74% of the world's poultry production, 50% of pork, 43% of beef, and 68% of eggs, according to the Worldwatch Institute. Proportions are significantly higher in developed countries, but are growing rapidly in developing countries, where demand is also growing fast. However, in the US, only about 11% of soybean acres and 14% of corn acres are irrigated; in contrast, about 66% of vegetable acres and 79% of orchard acres are irrigated. Soybean meal for livestock feed is commonly produced after extraction of soybean oil (used for cooking, food products, biodiesel, etc., so that only a fraction of processing is assignable to feed. Such examples illustrate that issues relating to irrigation, fertilization and processing for meat production should also be of concern with regard to production of other foods.

In one study, grass-fed cattle were estimated to account for 40% less greenhouse emissions than CAFO cattle However, comparative effects on emissions can vary. In a US study, lower GHG emissions were associated with feedlot-finished beef production than with beef production on pasture and hay. Similarly, a study in New Zealand concluded that environmental emissions per kilogram of beef produced can be reduced by incorporating feedlot finishing in a beef production system. Another factor to be considered is the role of a healthy pastoral ecosystem in carbon sequestration.

Because CAFO production is highly centralized, the transport of animals to slaughter and then to distant retail outlets is a further source of greenhouse gas emissions.

In livestock production, emissions are reduced by feeding human-inedible materials that might otherwise by wasted. Elferink et al. state that "Currently, 70% of the feedstock used in the Dutch feed industry originates from the food processing industry." Among several US examples is the feeding of distillers grains remaining from biofuel production. For the marketing year 2009/2010, the amount of dried distillers grains used as livestock feed (and residual) in the US amounted to 25.0 million tonnes.

== Distance traveled and method of transit ==
Take a Bite Out Of Climate Change flashcards

Carbon emissions from transport account for 11% of the total carbon emissions of food, of which the transportation from producer to consumer accounts for 4%. However, "food miles" are a misleading measure; in many cases food imported from the other side of the world may have a lower carbon footprint than a locally produced equivalent, due to differences in farming methods. "Local food" campaigns may be motivated by protectionism rather than genuine environmentalism.

When looking at total greenhouse gases (not just carbon dioxide), 83% of emissions come from the actual production of the food because of the methane released by livestock and the nitrous oxide due to fertilizer.

The word locavore describes a person attempting to eat a diet consisting of foods harvested from within a 100-mile radius. Some studies have criticized the emphasis on local food, claiming that it romanticizes local production, but does not produce very much environmental benefit. Transportation accounts for a relatively small portion of overall energy consumption in food production, and locally produced food may be much more energy intensive than food produced in a better area. Additionally the emphasis on "inefficient" local producers over more efficient ones further away may be damaging.

== Processing, packaging, and waste ==
Highly processed foods (such as granola bars, snack chips, dessert treats, etc.) come in individual packaging, demanding high energy inputs and resulting in packaging waste. Although processed foods create much packaging waste, some studies suggest that there are pros: Food packaging is important for maintaining the freshness of food items throughout their transit journeys. Additionally, food packaging ensures the safety of the food products by keeping them clean and sanitary. Lastly, consumers get important information about what ingredients the food was made with by reading the food packaging.

Bottled water is another example of a highly packaged food product that is considered a single-use plastic because most people discard it after they're done drinking the water. It is estimated that Americans throw away 40 million plastic water bottles every day, and bottled water is often shipped trans-continentally. Carbonated water must be chilled and kept under pressure during storage and transport so as to keep the carbon dioxide dissolved. This factor contributes greater energy usage for products shipped longer distances.

A 2023 study by Siddiqui S. A., et al. evaluated the quality of biodegradable packaging versus conventional plastic packaging for the meat packaging industry in the European Union. Conventional plastic packaging is known for being very flexible and able to stretch greatly during processing, shipping, and handling. With easily customizable production and relatively low cost, plastic packaging is picked most often over glass, cardboard, and other sustainable packaging materials. This study researched which types of biodegradable packaging are the most heat-resistant as well, as plastic has tested superior in this aspect in the past. The future of sustainability with low-carbon production for food packaging rides on biodegradable packaging. Cellulose-based packaging was highly effective at controlling moisture within meat packages in the EU and was able to prevent oxygen from entering. Polyhydroxyalkanoates and polylactic acid (PLA) are examples of sustainable food packaging materials that are considered better than plastic, but could actually be harmful because they may contain chemical additives.

== See also ==
- Ethical eating
- Farm to fork
- List of diets
- Local food movement
- Sustainable food system
- The 100-Mile Diet
- Vertical farming
- Environmental vegetarianism

== Additional sources ==
- Carlsson-Kanyama, Annika; Ekstrom, Marianne; Pipping Shanahan, Helena (2003). "Food and life cycle energy inputs: consequences of diet and ways to increase efficiency". Ecological Economics. 44 (2–3): 293–307. Bibcode:2003EcoEc..44..293C. doi:10.1016/s0921-8009(02)00261-6.
- Miguel Llanos, "Plastic bottles pile up as mountains of waste," (2005), MSNBC
