= Livestock's Long Shadow =

United Nations report

- Author: Henning Steinfeld, Pierre Gerber, Tom Wassenaar, Vincent Castel, Mauricio Rosales, Cees de Haan.
- Language: English
- Genre: Agriculture; Environment
- Publisher: Food and Agriculture Organization of the United Nations
- Publication date: 2006
- Media type: book website
- Pages: 390 pp
- ISBN: 92-5-105571-8
- OCLC: 77563364
- LC Class: SF140.E25 S744 2006

Livestock's Long Shadow: Environmental Issues and Options is a United Nations report, released by the Food and Agriculture Organization (FAO) of the United Nations on 29 November 2006, that "aims to assess the full impact of the livestock sector on environmental problems, along with potential technical and policy approaches to mitigation". It stated that livestock accounts for 18% of anthropogenic greenhouse gas emissions, a figure which FAO changed to 14.5% in its 2013 study Tackling climate change through livestock.

The report was a source of controversy at the time of its publication: both because some scholars thought that the report underestimated the impact of livestock on climate change, while Meat industry stakeholders both publicly critiqued the report and influenced meat producing countries to complain to FAO.

== Report ==
Livestock's Long Shadow is an assessment of research, taking into account direct impacts of livestock production, along with the impacts of feed crop cultivation. The report states that the livestock sector is one of the top two or three most significant contributors to serious environmental problems. The findings of this report suggest that it should be a major policy focus when dealing with problems of land degradation, climate change and air pollution, water shortage and water pollution, and loss of biodiversity.

Senior author Henning Steinfeld stated that livestock are "one of the most significant contributors to today's most serious environmental problems" and that "urgent action is required to remedy the situation."

Following a life-cycle analysis approach, the report evaluates "that livestock are responsible for 18% of greenhouse gas emissions." Greenhouse gas (GHG) emissions arise from feed production (e.g. chemical fertilizer production, deforestation for pasture and feed crops, cultivation of feed crops, feed transport and soil erosion), animal production (e.g. enteric fermentation and methane and nitrous oxide emissions from manure) and as a result of the transportation of animal products. Following this approach the report estimates that livestock "is responsible for 18 percent" of total anthropogenic carbon dioxide emissions, but 37% of methane and 65% of nitrous oxide emissions. The main sources of emissions were found to be:

- Land use and land use change: 2.5 Gigatonnes carbon dioxide equivalent; including forest and other natural vegetation replaced by pasture and feed crop in the Neotropics (CO_{2}) and carbon release from soils such as pasture and arable land dedicated to feed production (CO_{2})
- Feed Production (except carbon released from soil): 0.4 Gigatonnes CO_{2} equivalent, including fossil fuel used in manufacturing chemical fertilizer for feed crops (CO_{2}) and chemical fertilizer application on feed crops and leguminous feed crop (N_{2}O, NH_{3})
- Animal production: 1.9 Gigatonnes CO_{2} equivalent, including enteric fermentation from ruminants (CH_{4}) and on-farm fossil fuel use (CO_{2})
- Manure Management: 2.2 Gigatonnes CO_{2} equivalent, mainly through manure storage, application and deposition (CH_{4}, N_{2}O, NH_{3})
- Processing and international transport: 0.03 Gigatonnes CO_{2} equivalent

== Controversy ==
A 2009 article in the Worldwatch Institute magazine by authors Robert Goodland and Jeff Anhang, then employed at the World Bank, claimed that the FAO report was too conservative and that livestock sector accounts for much more of global GHG emissions, at least 51%, taking into account animal respiration and photosynthetic capacity of the land used for feeding and housing livestock. A 2011 response to this was published by FAO and an international coalition of scientists, discrediting the magazine article and upholding the 2006 assessment. But this response was fully answered back in the journal Animal Feed Science and Technology (AFST), and they reiterated their estimate while FAO scientists declined to continue the debate despite AFST's Editor's invitation. In 2013 FAO publicly partnered with International Meat Secretariat and the International Dairy Federation and many of the same authors of the first report published a subsequent (2013) study for the FAO, revising their estimate of anthropogenic greenhouse gas emissions due to livestock downward to 14.5% without addressing any of the alleged errors pointed out in Goodland and Anhang's report or in the ensuing peer-reviewed debate.

The results of Livestock's Long Shadow had an error in methodology as the authors only evaluated the tailpipe emissions of cars, while for meat production a comprehensive life-cycle assessment was used to calculate livestock's green house gas effect. This underestimated transportation therefore inflating meat productions contribution. This issue was raised by Dr. Frank Mitloehner from the University of California, Davis. In an interview with BBC Pierre Gerber, one of the authors of Livestock's Long Shadow, accepted Mitloehner's criticism. "I must say honestly that he has a point - we factored in everything for meat emissions, and we didn't do the same thing with transport, we just used the figure from the IPCC..." he said. However, this information was the inspiration behind movements such as "Meatless Monday"

Mitloehner is the author of a 2009 study on the topic of livestock and climate change. Five percent of the funds for said study were provided by the livestock industry, according to a press release by Mitloehner's university. FAO cites him as a representative of the International Feed Industry Federation, whose "vision is to provide a unified voice and leadership to represent and promote the global feed industry as an essential participant in the food chain that provides sustainable, safe, nutritious and affordable food for a growing world population." Between 2002 and 2021 Mitloehner and his research center received $12.5 million in funding from industry groups. 2019 they coordinated efforts to discredit the EAT Lancet report. Later they led the campaign #yes2meat on social media.

== References to the report ==
The report was the main scientific source for the documentary Meat The Truth, narrated by Marianne Thieme (2007).

It was frequently cited in the documentary Cowspiracy (2014).

== See also ==
- Environmental issues with agriculture
- Stock-free agriculture
- Veganism
