= Seed: The Untold Story =

Seed: The Untold Story is a 2016 documentary film which explores the decline in seed diversity and the movement to reverse it.
