= Vegan organic agriculture =

Organic agriculture with minimal animal products

Vegan organic (or veganic) agriculture is the organic production of food and other crops with minimal animal inputs. Unlike organic and conventional agriculture, veganic agriculture functions without using animal by-products.

Animal by-products include bloodmeal, fish products, bone meal, feces, or other animal-origin matter. Some of these materials are by-products of animal husbandry, created during the process of cultivating animals for the production of meat, milk, skins, furs, entertainment, labor, or companionship. The sale of such by-products decreases expenses and increases profit for those engaged in animal husbandry and therefore helps support the animal husbandry industry, an outcome most vegans find unacceptable. Farms that rely upon animal by-products directly support intensive livestock farming which is highly unsustainable for the environment Intensive livestock farming is one of the leading contributors to GHG emissions.

Vegan organic farming is much less common than organic farming. However, there is a young growing method of vegan organic farming called Biocyclic vegan organic farming. This newer method has great advantages among the environment and other aspects of farming, but comes with a few downfalls as well.

== Veganic gardening ==
The veganic gardening method is a distinct system developed by Rosa Dalziel O'Brien, Kenneth Dalziel O'Brien and May E. Bruce, although the term was originally coined by Geoffrey Rudd as a contraction of vegetable organic in order to "denote a clear distinction between conventional chemical-based systems and organic ones based on animal manures". The O'Brien system's principal argument is that animal manures are harmful to soil health rather than that their use involves exploitation of and cruelty to animals.

The system employs very specific techniques including the addition of straw and other vegetable wastes to the soil in order to maintain soil fertility. Gardeners following the system use soil-covering mulches, and employ non-compacting surface cultivation techniques using any short-handled, wide-bladed, hand hoe. They kneel when surface cultivating, placing a board under their knees to spread out the pressure, and prevent soil compaction. Kenneth Dalziel O'Brien published a description of his system in Veganic Gardening, the Alternative System for Healthier Crops:

The veganic method of clearing heavily infested land is to take advantage of a plant's tendencies to move its roots nearer to the soil's surface when it is deprived of light. To make use of this principle, aided by a decaying process of the top growth of weeds, etc., it is necessary to subject such growth to heat and moisture in order to speed up the decay, and this is done by applying lime, then a heavy straw cover, and then the herbal compost activator...The following are required: Sufficient new straw to cover an area to be cleared to a depth of 3 to 4 inches.

== Benefits of vegan organic agriculture ==
While it may be hard to get started in the veganic farming industry, the principle of veganic farming comes with specific advantages. One advantage is that when you farm using vegan organic principles, one may advertise their product as farmed vegan organically rather than having a regular organic label on the product. This will instill a sense of safety in the customer because it eliminates a big deal of risk that is associated with the food safety of conventional and regular organic farming. It will also benefit the producer of these vegan organic crops because they are able to charge more for their product because of supply and demand for the labels on their products. Additionally, using biocyclic vegan humus soil increases the sustainability of soil by improving the fertility as well as structure of the soil, all while not using animal by-products. This method is commonly used to help improve the fertility of degrading soil.

== Challenges of vegan organic farming ==
A study that interviewed 25 managers of vegan organic farms was conducted and found some difficulties that most of the managers encountered upon starting their farm. Specifically, managers said that the hardest part was finding vegan products to use in their operation rather than products composed using animal by-products. Along with this, it is hard for new vegan organic farmers to learn how to farm using veganic principles. Not only is it hard to learn, but it is also very expensive to become certified as a Biocyclic vegan organic farm. Additionally, it can be hard for farmers to create a vegan organic farm because the location of the farm needs to be on fertile soil. Vegan organic farms are more sustainable among the environment, however their yield is significantly lower than conventional farming. Some vegan organic farmers are able to make up for this lack of produce through the elevated cost of organic goods, but it still does not make up for the necessity for a surplus of food due to the growing population of the world.

== Practices ==
Vegan organic growers maintain soil fertility using green manures, cover crops, green wastes, composted vegetable matter, and minerals. Some vegan gardeners may supplement this with human urine from vegans (which provides nitrogen) and 'humanure' from vegans, produced from compost toilets.

Farms certified as biocyclic vegan use preventative methods to manage insects. If these fail, however, the label allows them to use insecticides such as Bacillus thuringiensis, which starves larvae to death.

== Certification and promotion ==
If a manager of a veganic farm would like to follow specific guidelines as a vegan organic farmer, they can adopt Biocyclic vegan farming. Biocyclic vegan farming is similar to original vegan organic farming; however, it follows specific standards that are inspected which allows for the farmed to be certified as a Biocyclic farm. The definition of Biocyclic-vegan means to support and advocate for natural life cycles and to shift to nutrient cycles that are reliant upon plants rather than animal by-products. The Biocyclic vegan organic label allows a consumer to see that the product they are purchasing was made using no animal by-products.

The Biocyclic Vegan Standard is an IFOAM-accredited organic standard for vegan organic farms. It is awarded by BNS Biocyclic Network Services Ltd (a Cypriot company), and has accredited 21 farms in Europe as of February 2022. The German Environment Agency awarded the German biocyclic vegan association some 60,000 euros for the promotion of the biocyclic vegan standard from 2021 to 2022.

As of February 2022, 19 farms in the United Kingdom and Ireland are certified vegan organic by the Stockfree Organic label. Farms wanting to obtain the label are certified by the Soil Association, and the label's requirements are determined by the Vegan Organic Network.

== See also ==
- Animal-free agriculture
- Climate-friendly gardening
- Deep ecology
- Environmental vegetarianism
- Plants for a Future
- Agroecology

== References and further reading ==
- Growing Green: Organic Techniques for a Sustainable Future by Jenny Hall and Iain Tolhurst. Vegan Organic Network publishing, 2006, ISBN 0-9552225-0-8. Available in the US from Chelsea Green Publishing, ISBN 978-1-933392-49-3.
- Growing Our Own: A Guide to Vegan Gardening by Kathleen Jannaway. Movement for Compassionate Living publishing, 1987. ASIN B001OQ7G8S.
- Plants for a Future: Edible and Useful Plants for a Healthier World by Ken Fern. Hampshire: Permanent Publications, 1997. ISBN 1-85623-011-2.
- Veganic Gardening- The Alternative System for Healthier Crops by Kenneth Dalziel O'Brien. Thorsons Publishing, 1986, ISBN 0-7225-1208-2.
- Will Bonsall’s Essential Guide to Radical, Self-reliant Gardening: Innovative Techniques for Growing Vegetables, Grains, and Perennial Food Crops with Minimal Fossil Fuel and Animal Inputs by Will Bonsall. Chelsea Green Publishing. 2015. ISBN 1603584420.
