= Chris Hendrickson =

American environmental engineer (born 1950)

Chris T. Hendrickson (born March 31, 1950) is an American environmental engineer.

Hendrickson was born in Oakland, California, and earned his bachelor's and first master's degree from Stanford University in 1973. He received a Rhodes Scholarship for further study at the University of Oxford, where he obtained a second master's degree in 1975. Hendrickson completed a doctorate at the Massachusetts Institute of Technology in 1978. He then began teaching at Carnegie Mellon University. Hendrickson was appointed Duquesne Light Company Professor of Engineering in 1996, and was named Hamerschlag University Professor in 2014, until gaining emeritus status the next year.

He was elected a fellow of the American Association for the Advancement of Science in 2007. In 2011, Hendrickson was elected to membership of the United States National Academy of Engineering "for leadership and contributions in transportation and green design engineering." The National Academy of Construction granted Hendrickson an equivalent honor in 2014, for "outstanding systems oriented research and leadership contributions in construction project management, transportation, and green design."
