= Umweltbundesamt =

German environmental agency

German government environmental agency Umweltbundesamt
- Abbreviation: UBA
- Formation: 1974
- Type: Government agency
- Headquarters: Dessau-Roßlau, Saxony-Anhalt
- Region served: Germany
- Official language: German
- Leader: Dirk Messner
- Staff: 1,600
- Website: umweltbundesamt.de

The Umweltbundesamt (German pronunciation: [ˈʊmvɛltˌbʊndəsʔamt]; UBA, German: [uːbeːˈʔaː]) is the environment agency of the German government. Together with the Federal Agency for Nature Conservation, the Federal Office for the Safety of Nuclear Waste Management, and the Bundesamt für Strahlenschutz ("federal office for nuclear radiation protection"), it operates under the jurisdiction of the Federal Ministry for the Environment, Nature Conservation, Nuclear Safety and Consumer Protection. The tasks of the office are primarily "the scientific support of the federal government (including the Federal Ministries for the Environment, Health, Economy and Climate Protection, Education and Research, Transport and Digital Infrastructure), the implementation of environmental laws (e.g., emission rights trade, admission of chemicals, medicinal and pesticides), and public information on environmental protection", based on independent research. With around 1,600 employees, the agency is the largest environmental authority in Europe.

== History ==
In the early 1970s, the FDP politician and then-interior minister Hans-Dietrich Genscher called for the creation of an environmental authority to match similar bodies in the US and Sweden. Against resistance, especially by the Ministry of Health, which feared a loss of competence in the field of environmental protection, the Federal Office of Environmental Affairs was created in 1973, and on 22 July 1974, became the Federal Environment Agency, as an independent federal authority, based in Berlin. The decision of the Bundestag, on 19 June 1974, which established West Berlin as the seat of the office, led to official protests by the GDR state department the following day. The Soviet Union also opposed this, as it deemed the 1971 Four-Power Agreement to be violated by a federal agency based in Berlin.

After Germany's reunification, a number of federal agencies were relocated to the former East Germany to support the structurally weak region. The UBA's headquarters, with around 1,000 employees, was moved to Dessau-Roßlau, a city of 80,000 inhabitants in Saxony-Anhalt.

=== Presidency ===
The president of the Umweltbundesamt from 1974 to 1995 was the lawyer Heinrich von Lersner. He was succeeded by economist Andreas Troge, who led the agency until 2009, before ceding it to Jochen Flasbarth, who remained until 2013. Maria Krautzberger led the department between 2014 and 2020 and was succeeded by Dirk Messner.
