= Nature Food =

- Discipline: Food science
- Language: English
- Edited by: Juliana Gil

Publication details
- History: 2020–present
- Publisher: Nature Portfolio
- Frequency: Monthly
- Open access: Hybrid
- Impact factor: 24.7 (2025)

Standard abbreviations
- ISO 4: Nat. Food

Indexing
- CODEN: NFAOAI
- ISSN: 2662-1355
- OCLC no.: 1135760820

Links
- Journal homepage; Online archive

Nature Food is a monthly peer-reviewed academic journal published by Nature Portfolio. It was established in 2020. The editor-in-chief is Juliana Gil.

== Abstracting and indexing ==
The journal is abstracted and indexed in:

- Science Citation Index Expanded
- Scopus

According to the Journal Citation Reports, the journal has a 2025 impact factor of 24.7, ranking it 1st out of 143 journals in the category "Food Science & Technology".
