= Georgiana Welch =

Patron of religious and political unorthodoxy

- Born: Georgiana Fletcher Ford; 9 June 1792; Thames Ditton, Surrey, England
- Died: 8 April 1879 (aged 86); Ebworth Park, Gloucestershire, England
- Occupations: Patron of religious and political unorthodoxy
- Relatives: Sophia Chichester (sister)
- Family: Anson family; Vernon family

Georgiana Fletcher Welch (née Ford; 9 June 1792 – 8 April 1879) was an English patron of religious and political unorthodoxy.

== Biography ==
Georgina Fletcher Ford was born in Thames Ditton, Surrey, on 9 June 1792. She was one of eight children of the slave and plantation owning baronet Sir Francis Ford and his wife Mary (née Anson). In 1816 she married Stephen John Fletcher Welch who owned Ebworth Park. The marriage was not a success and she became separated from him about 1820 and strongly dissatisfied with the marriage laws in the country. She rented the house and lands from her husband who moved to Paris.

Welch's sister Sophia Chichester became a widow a year after her marriage to John Chichester. She moved to live with Welch and together the sisters began to patronise religious radicalism and political unorthodoxy. As the ladies of the big house, charity was expected of them but the books and support the women gave to the weavers in their locality was subversive literature and they were opposed by the local clergy. They gave financial support to evangelical preachers, spiritual and political. They became friends of the reformer James Pierrepont Greaves as well as secularist George Jacob Holyoake and Robert Owen. It is hard to tell from correspondence who is writing because the sisters wrote as one, sharing their names on their letters.

In 1844 they left Ebworth Park and came to live at Ham Common near the community and school founded by Greaves called the Concordium or Alcott House. In later years their mentor was James Elishama Smith, who they financially supported. Their attempts to reform the world were performed predominantly from their home by letter, at times via an agent, B. D. Cousins, himself a radical publisher. Their correspondence with Richard Carlile and their support for him expresses their ultra radical positions and careful proselytising.

Welch was supportive only while interested and when she suffered a depressive episode she lost much of her interest in some of the people when they later needed her. After her sister's death in 1847, Welch remained quietly at home in Ebworth and her radical activities appear to have ended. She died there on 8 April 1879.
