= Sophia Chichester =

English patron of religious and political unorthodoxy (1795–1847)

- Born: Sophia Catherine Ford; 7 August 1795; London, England
- Died: 29 April 1847 (aged 51); Ospringe, Kent, England
- Occupations: Patron of religious and political unorthodoxy
- Notable work: Translation of Le Phalanstère
- Spouse: John Palmer Chichester (m. 1822; died 1823)
- Relatives: Georgina Welch (sister); Thomas Anson (uncle); George Anson (grandfather)
- Family: Anson family; Vernon family

Sophia Catherine Chichester (née Ford; 7 August 1795 – 29 April 1847) was an English patron of religious and political unorthodoxy. She supported the work of reformers including Robert Owen and Richard Carlile, and was president of the British and Foreign Society for the Promotion of Humanity and Abstinence from Animal Food. Along with her sister, Georgina Welch, she has been described as "a unique case of upper-class female radicalism in early Victorian England."

== Biography ==
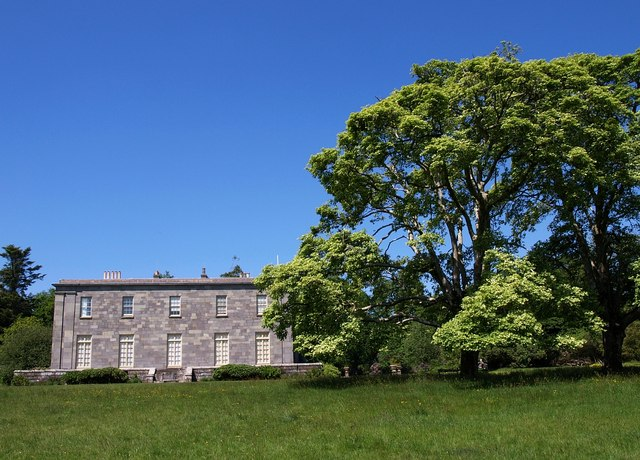
Arlington Court, owned by Colonel John Palmer Chichester

Sophia Catherine Ford was born in London on 7 August 1795, the fifth of eight children, to Sir Francis Ford (1758–1801) and Mary (née Anson; 1763–1837). Her father owned estates and slaves in Barbados. He was appointed a baronet in 1793 after being elected to parliament for Newcastle under Lyme. Her mother, was the daughter of George Anson of Shugborough, Staffordshire, and Mary, the daughter of the first Lord Vernon. Following her father's death in 1801, the children's uncle, Thomas Anson, who became a viscount in 1806, assumed guardianship of the Ford children.

In 1822, she married Colonel John Palmer Chichester (1769–1823), who owned the Arlington Court estate in north Devon. Her husband died the following year, leaving Sophia wealthy and independent. She joined her sister, Georgina Welch, at Ebworth Park, an estate owned by Georgina's husband. Together, and in accordance with their financial means, the women were able to exercise significantly more agency than many at the time.

Georgina was separated from her husband, and a shared dissatisfaction with the existing marriage laws was a driving force behind both women's unorthodoxy. The sisters "began to cultivate unorthodox prophets, preachers, and political subversives, protecting their privacy while dispensing gifts of money by letter." Mystic and reformer James Pierrepont Greaves became close to Sophia and Georgina, and was a guest at Ebworth Park. Sophia gave Greaves £100 a year, and supported Alcott House, the utopian community he had founded in 1838. She remained a major benefactor of the community until her death in 1847.

From 1837, Sophia entered into a correspondence with radical publisher Richard Carlile, offering friendship and financial support. The sisters, whose individual correspondence it is difficult to discern from one another's, described the "irrational & immoral custom of marriage", boasting of their reading of radical publications. In 1838, they declared:

Everything is good that will break up and break down the present laws, systems, and arrangements of marriage, which as now existing in every grade of society, are most vicious and demoralising altogether.

In 1839, Sophia fell in love with and became engaged to John Westland Marston, a 19-year-old poet. However, Greaves forbade the marriage, and the engagement was broken off.

Sophia and Georgina also corresponded with secularist George Jacob Holyoake, as well as with Robert Owen. In these years, despite her proclamations of radicalism and support of unorthodoxy, Sophia was described as "a fair, well preserved, good-looking woman... with quiet, subdued, well-bred manners and gentleness of speech." Typically, the sisters' efforts towards reform took place at a safe distance from others. As Jackie Latham has written, "[a]ll the evidence suggests that, supporting each other emotionally, they worked in isolation to reform the world with the means that their circumstances offered: correspondence and money."

In 1841, Sophia translated Le Phalanstère, a work by Belgian Fourierist Zoé de Gamond. Latham describes this anonymous translation as enabling "an upper-class Englishwoman [to] safely identify herself with the continental revolutions." As well as demonstrating her deep interest in Fourierist ideas, in her copious footnotes, Sophia "seized the opportunity to express publicly, although anonymously, ideas and feelings that otherwise would have remained hidden."

Around 1842, she was appointed president of the British and Foreign Society for the Promotion of Humanity and Abstinence from Animal Food. The society has been described as a forerunner to the Vegetarian Society.

Sophia died on 29 April 1847 from tuberculosis at Syndale House in Ospringe, Kent, the residence of her younger sister and brother-in-law. She was buried on 7 May at the local church. Georgiana died at Ebworth on 8 April 1879, having reconciled with the church, her family, and resumed consumption of meat and alcohol.
