= Vegetarianism =

Abstaining from meat consumption

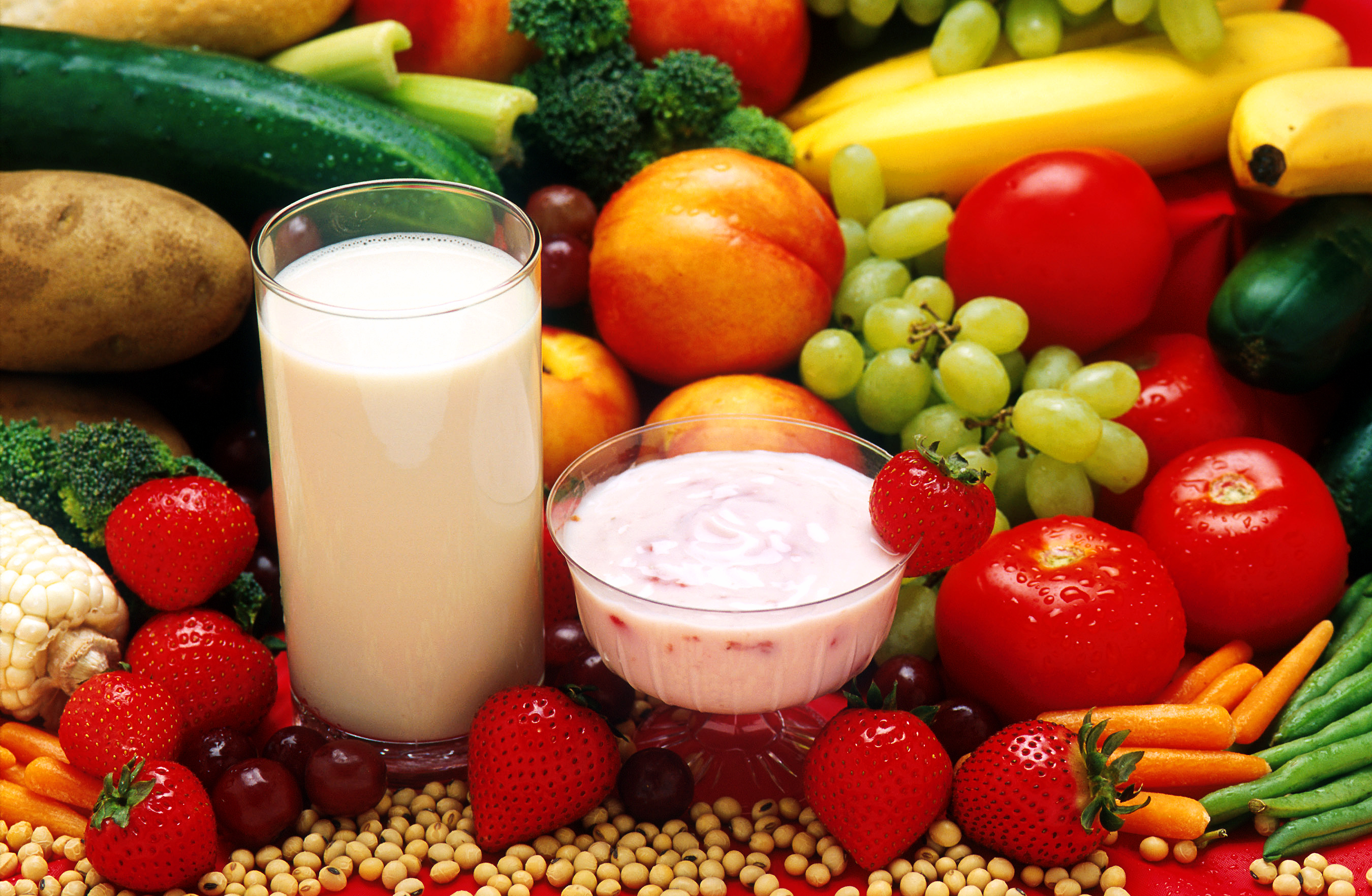
- Description: Diet derived from plants, with or without dairy, eggs, and honey
- Varieties: Ovo, lacto, lacto-ovo, veganism, raw veganism, fruitarianism, pescetarianism, Indian, Sattvic, religious (Hindu, Buddhist, Christian, Islamic, Jain, Jewish)

Vegetarianism is the practice of abstaining from the consumption of meat (red meat, poultry, seafood, freshwater fish, insects, and the flesh of any other animal). It may also include abstaining from eating all by-products of animal slaughter. A person who practices vegetarianism is known as a vegetarian.

Vegetarianism may be adopted for various reasons. Many people object to eating meat out of respect for sentient animal life. Such ethical motivations have been codified under various religious beliefs as well as animal rights advocacy. Other motivations for vegetarianism are health-related, political, environmental, cultural, aesthetic, economic, taste-related, or relate to other personal preferences. A healthy vegetarian dietary pattern is one of three healthy eating patterns recommended in the Dietary Guidelines for Americans, 2020–2025, alongside the Healthy U.S.-Style and Healthy Mediterranean-Style patterns.

A small number of towns and cities around the world are exclusively vegetarian or have outlawed meat, including Rishikesh in India, which banned meat, fish, and eggs in 1956. A larger number of towns and cities are vegetarian-friendly. In other locations, finding vegetarian food can pose some difficulties.

There are many variations of the vegetarian diet: a lacto-vegetarian diet includes dairy products, an ovo-vegetarian diet includes eggs, and a lacto-ovo vegetarian diet includes both. All of them include honey. As the strictest of vegetarian diets, a vegan diet excludes all animal products, and can be accompanied by the abstention from animal-derived products, such as leather shoes and silk clothes.

Vegetarian diets pose some difficulties. For vitamin B_{12}, depending on the presence or absence of eggs and dairy products in the diet or other reliable B_{12} sources, vegetarians or vegans may incur a nutritional deficiency. Packaged and processed foods may contain minor quantities of animal ingredients. While some vegetarians scrutinize product labels for such ingredients, others do not object to consuming them, or are unaware of their presence.

== Etymology ==
The first written use of the term "vegetarian" originated in the early 19th century, when authors referred to a vegetable regimen diet. Historically, 'vegetable' could be used to refer to any type of edible vegetation. Modern dictionaries explain its origin as a compound of vegetable (adjective) and the suffix -arian (in the sense of agrarian).

The term was popularized with the foundation of the Vegetarian Society in Manchester in 1847, although it has been in use since around 1839 to refer to what was previously called a vegetable regimen or diet. It was used in writing first attributed to actress, writer and abolitionist Fanny Kemble, in her Journal of a Residence on a Georgian plantation in 1838–1839. (Note: Fanny Kemble (Journal of a Residence on a Georgian Plantation in 1838–1839, 1839): "The sight and smell of raw meat are especially odious to me, and I have often thought that if I had had to be my own cook, I should inevitably become a vegetarian, probably, indeed, return entirely to my green and salad days." Another early use was by the editor of The Healthian, a journal published by Alcott House, in April 1842: "To tell a man, who is in the stocks for a given fault, that he cannot be so confined for such an offence, is ridiculous enough; but not more so than to tell a healthy vegetarian that his diet is very uncongenial with the wants of his nature, and contrary to reason.") The earliest occurrences of the term seem to be related to Alcott House—a school on the north side of Ham Common, London—which was opened in July 1838 by James Pierrepont Greaves. From 1841, it was known as A Concordium, or Industry Harmony College, and the institution then began to publish its own pamphlet, The Healthian. It provides some of the earliest appearances of the term "vegetarian".

== History ==
=== Prehistory and early origins ===
In 2025, a study published in Science measured nitrogen isotope ratios in fossilized teeth and determined that Australopithecus was almost entirely vegetarian.

=== Indian subcontinent ===
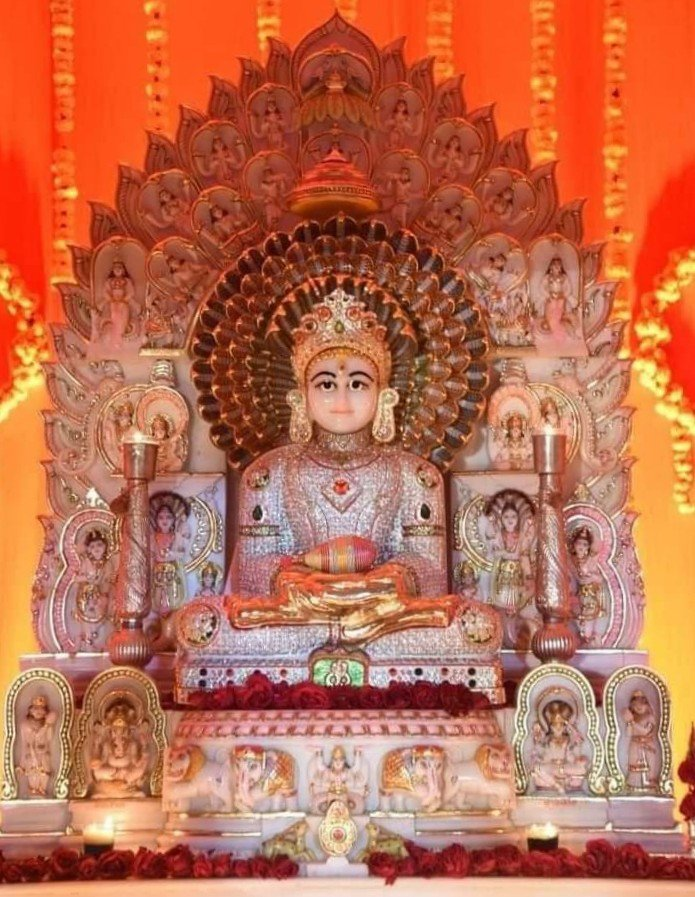
Parshwanatha founded Jain vegetarianism in the 9th century BCE

While the broader concept of nonviolence (Ahimsa) developed across multiple ancient Indian philosophies, Jainism was unique in establishing strict vegetarianism as an absolute, non-negotiable mandate for all followers—both ascetics and the lay community. The earliest record of vegetarianism comes from the 9th century BCE, inculcating tolerance towards all living beings. Pārśvanātha and Mahavira, the 23rd and 24th tirthankaras in Jainism, respectively, revived and advocated ahimsa and Jain vegetarianism between the 8th and 6th centuries BCE; the most comprehensive and strictest form of vegetarianism. However, the institutional origins of this strict lay mandate are sociologically anchored in the narrative of Neminatha, the twenty-second tirthankara.

According to Jain tradition and noted by historical sociologists, the prince Neminatha abandoned his royal wedding in Junagadh after hearing the cries of captive animals slated to be slaughtered for the wedding feast. His refusal to predicate personal celebration upon animal slaughter, and his subsequent renunciation of worldly life, served as a defining cultural catalyst. His renunciation is said to be followed by his meditation at Mount Girnar. Scholars identify this narrative as the foundational charter myth that shifted vegetarianism from an isolated ascetic exercise in self-denial to a universal ethical baseline regarding animal welfare for the entire Jain community.

In Indian culture, vegetarianism has been closely connected with the attitude of nonviolence towards animals (called ahimsa in India) for millennia and was promoted by religious groups and philosophers. The Ācārāṅga Sūtra from 5th century BCE advocates Jain-vegetarianism and forbids the monks from walking on grass in order to avoid inflicting pain on them and prevent small insects dwelling inside from getting killed. The ancient Indian work of the Tirukkuṟaḷ, dated before the 5th century CE, explicitly and unambiguously emphasizes shunning meat and non-killing as a common man's virtues. Chapter 26 of the Tirukkural, particularly couplets 251–260, deals exclusively on moral vegetarianism or veganism.

Hemachandra, a 12th-century Jain scholar and monk, achieved a significant political victory for vegetarianism in Indian history. He successfully converted King Kumarapala of the Chaulukya dynasty (who ruled present-day Gujarat and surrounding areas) to Jainism. Under Hemachandra's guidance, King Kumarapala issued sweeping imperial edicts (amari-ghoshana) that legally banned the slaughter of animals across his entire kingdom. This alliance is historically responsible for cementing Gujarat as the geographic epicenter of strict vegetarian cuisine in India.

In the 16th century, the Jain monk Hiravijaya Suri was invited to the court of the Mughal Emperor Akbar. Through philosophical discussions regarding nonviolence, the monk persuaded the Emperor to issue imperial edicts (farmans) that legally enforced animal welfare across the empire. These edicts temporarily banned the slaughter of animals for several months of the year, prohibited fishing in specific sacred lakes, and mandated the release of thousands of caged birds. This represents one of the earliest recorded instances of state-enforced animal welfare and dietary restrictions at the imperial level in Indian history.

Vegetarianism in ancient India
Throughout the whole country the people do not kill any living creature, nor drink intoxicating liquor, nor eat onions or garlic. The only exception is that of the Chandalas. That is the name for those who are (held to be) wicked men, and live apart from others. ... In that country they do not keep pigs and fowls, and do not sell live cattle; in the markets there are no butchers' shops and no dealers in intoxicating drink. In buying and selling commodities they use cowries. Only the Chandalas are fishermen and hunters, and sell flesh meat.

— Faxian, Chinese pilgrim to India (4th/5th century CE), A Record of Buddhistic Kingdoms (translated by James Legge)

=== Mediterranean and ancient Greece ===
Among the Hellenes, Egyptians, and others, vegetarianism had medical or ritual purification purposes. Vegetarianism was also practiced in ancient Greece and the earliest reliable evidence for vegetarian theory and practice in Greece dates from the 6th century BCE. The Orphics, a religious movement spreading in Greece at that time, also practiced and promoted vegetarianism. Greek teacher Pythagoras, who promoted the altruistic doctrine of metempsychosis, may have practiced vegetarianism, but is also recorded as eating meat. A fictionalized portrayal of Pythagoras appears in Ovid's Metamorphoses, in which he advocates a form of strict vegetarianism. It was through this portrayal that Pythagoras was best known to English-speakers throughout the early modern period and, prior to the coinage of the word "vegetarianism", vegetarians were referred to in English as "Pythagoreans". Vegetarianism was also practiced about six centuries later in another instance (30 BCE–50 CE) in the northern Thracian region by the Moesi tribe (who inhabited present-day Serbia and Bulgaria), feeding themselves on honey, milk, and cheese.

=== East Asia ===
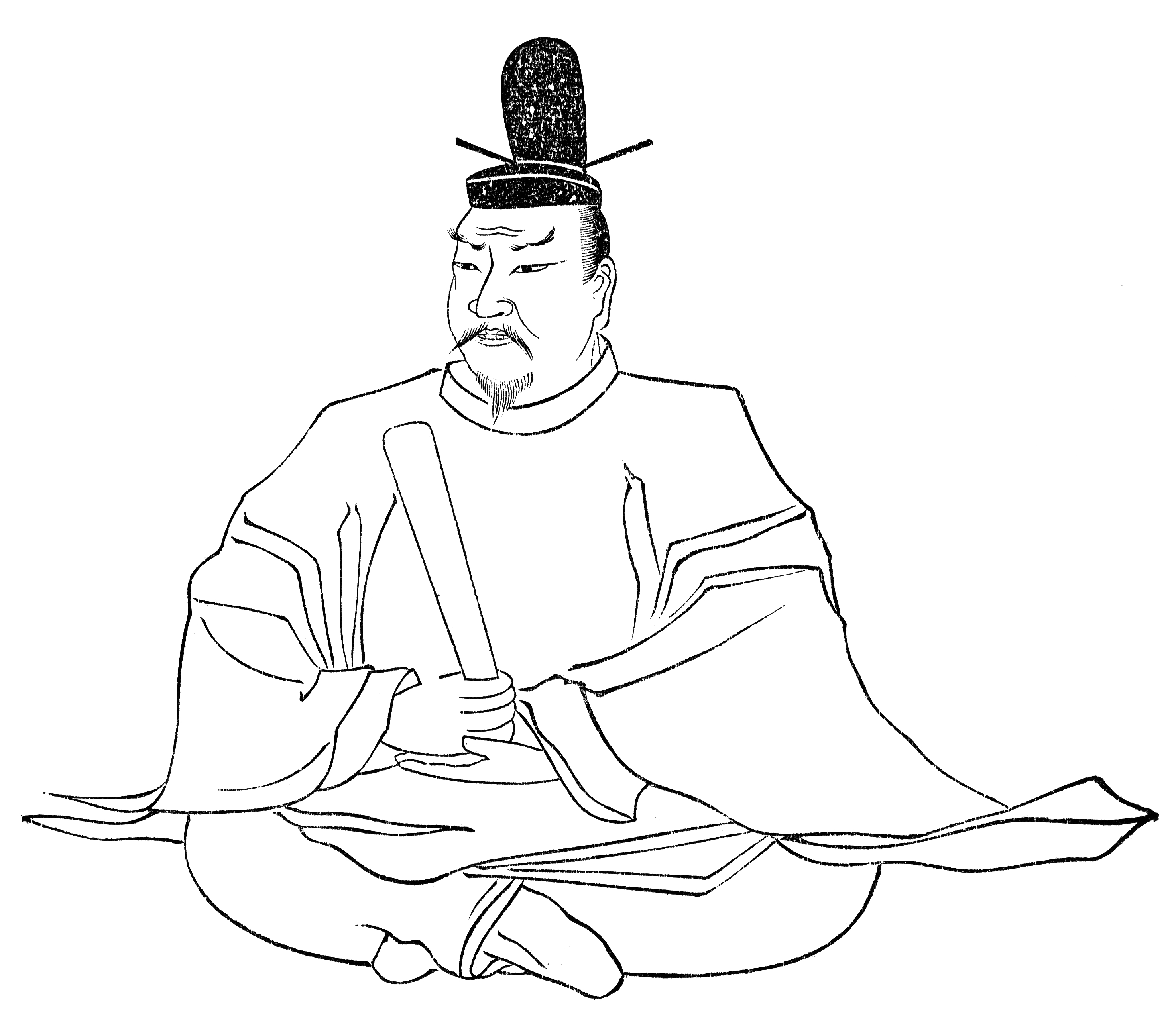
Emperor Tenmu began bans on the killing for and eating of meat in 675 CE in Japan.

In Japan in 675, the Emperor Tenmu prohibited the killing and the eating of meat during the busy farming period between April and September but excluded the eating of wild birds and wild animals. These bans and several others that followed over the centuries were overturned in the nineteenth century during the Meiji Restoration. In China, during the Song dynasty, Buddhist cuisine became popular enough that vegetarian restaurants appeared where chefs used ingredients such as beans, gluten, root vegetables and mushrooms to create meat analogues including pork, fowl, eggs and crab roe and many meat substitutes used even today such as tofu, seitan and konjac originate in Chinese Buddhist cuisine.

=== Early modern and modern era ===
Labeling is mandatory in India to distinguish vegetarian products (green) from non-vegetarian products (brown).

Following the Christianization of the Roman Empire in late antiquity, vegetarianism practically disappeared from Europe, as it did elsewhere, except in India. Several orders of monks in medieval Europe restricted or banned the consumption of meat for ascetic reasons, but none of them eschewed fish. Moreover, the medieval definition of "fish" included such animals as seals, porpoises, dolphins, barnacle geese, puffins, and beavers. Vegetarianism re-emerged during the Renaissance, becoming more widespread in the 19th and 20th centuries. In 1847, the first Vegetarian Society was founded in the United Kingdom; Germany, the Netherlands, and other countries followed. In 1886, the vegetarian colony Nueva Germania was founded in Paraguay, though its vegetarian aspect would prove short-lived. The International Vegetarian Union, an association of the national societies, was founded in 1908. In the Western world, the popularity of vegetarianism grew during the 20th century as a result of nutritional, ethical, and—more recently—environmental and economic concerns.

Virchand Gandhi was the official delegate representing Jainism at the first World's Parliament of Religions in Chicago in 1893. He was one of the first historical figures to defend Jain vegetarianism on a global stage to a Western audience. Gandhi systematically dismantled the contemporary Western assumption that vegetarianism led to physical weakness, successfully reframing the Jain diet in the West as a highly rational, scientifically grounded, and compassionate lifestyle. Shrimad Rajchandra, the spiritual mentor of Mahatma Gandhi advocated against animal sacrifice and encouraged him to abandon violence in the name of sacrifice.

== Vegetarian locations ==
A small number of cities, towns, and intentional communities around the world are exclusively vegetarian where no meat is sold or consumed due to religious and cultural influences. In all-vegetarian locations, meat and sometimes other animal products are sometimes officially outlawed. In other exclusively vegetarian cities, meat is not sold or served due to cultural influences but is not officially outlawed. Some religious centers in India have banned all meat sales within municipal boundaries. For example, in 1956, Rishikesh banned the sale of meat, fish, and eggs.

Locations where residents are vegetarian and only vegetarian food is consumed within city limits include:

- Amirim, Israel. Founded in 1958 on vegetarian principles, the town features vegetarian guest houses and had a population of 865 in 2022.
- Cheremshanka, Altai Republic in Russia
- Community of the Ark, La Borie Noble, France. Founded in 1948 by Lanza del Vasto as a vegetarian, spiritual commune.
- Haridwar in Uttarakhand, India. In 2002 meat sales were banned in Haridwar. The ban was upheld by the Supreme Court in 2004.
- New Vrindaban in West Virginia, United States. Founded in 1968 by Kirtanananda Swami, New Virndaban is a vegetarian, intentional community.
- Palitana in Gujarat, India. In 2014, Palitana banned meat sales.
- Pushkar in Rajasthan, India. Pushkar is one of the world's oldest cities and a religious center. Because of its holy status and number of temples, Pushkar is a vegetarian city where the sale of meat, fish, eggs, and alcohol are all banned.
- Rishikesh in Uttarakhand, India. In 1956, Rishikesh banned the sale of meat, fish, and eggs.
- Tirumala in Andhra Pradesh, India
- The Farm in Tennessee, United States. Founded in 1971 by Stephen Gaskin and 300 spiritual seekers as a vegan, intentional community.

=== Former all-vegetarian locations ===
- Alcott House in Surrey, United Kingdom
- Ephrata Cloister in Pennsylvania, United States
- Fruitlands in Massachusetts, United States
- Octagon City, Kansas, United States
- The Sanctuary (community) in West Sussex, United Kingdom

=== Heavily-vegetarian locations ===
The percentage of vegetarians varies by country. India has the highest percentage of vegetarian residents, and Mexico has the second highest percentage of vegetarian residents. In general, vegetarians are a minority. However, a number of cities and towns around the world have much larger vegetarian populations who constitute a majority of municipal residents. Heavily-vegetarian locations include:

- Bali in Indonesia
- Bengaluru the capital of Karnataka, India
- Chennai the capital of Tamil Nadu, India
- Chiang Mai in Thailand
- Loma Linda, California in the United States
- Shashamane in Oromia Region, Ethiopia
- Varanasi in Uttar Pradesh, India

== Varieties ==
There are a number of vegetarian diets that exclude or include various foods:

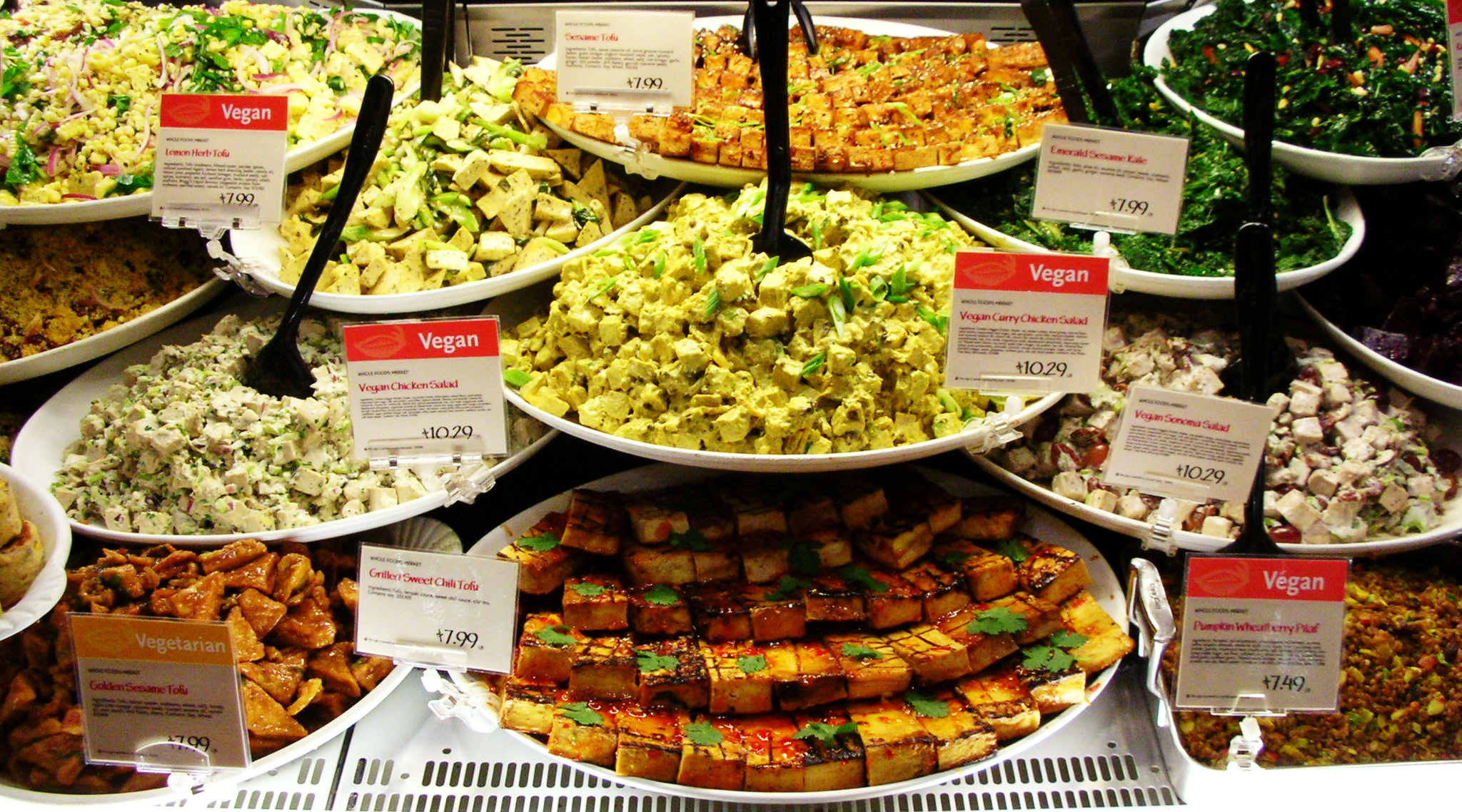
A variety of vegetarian and vegan deli food

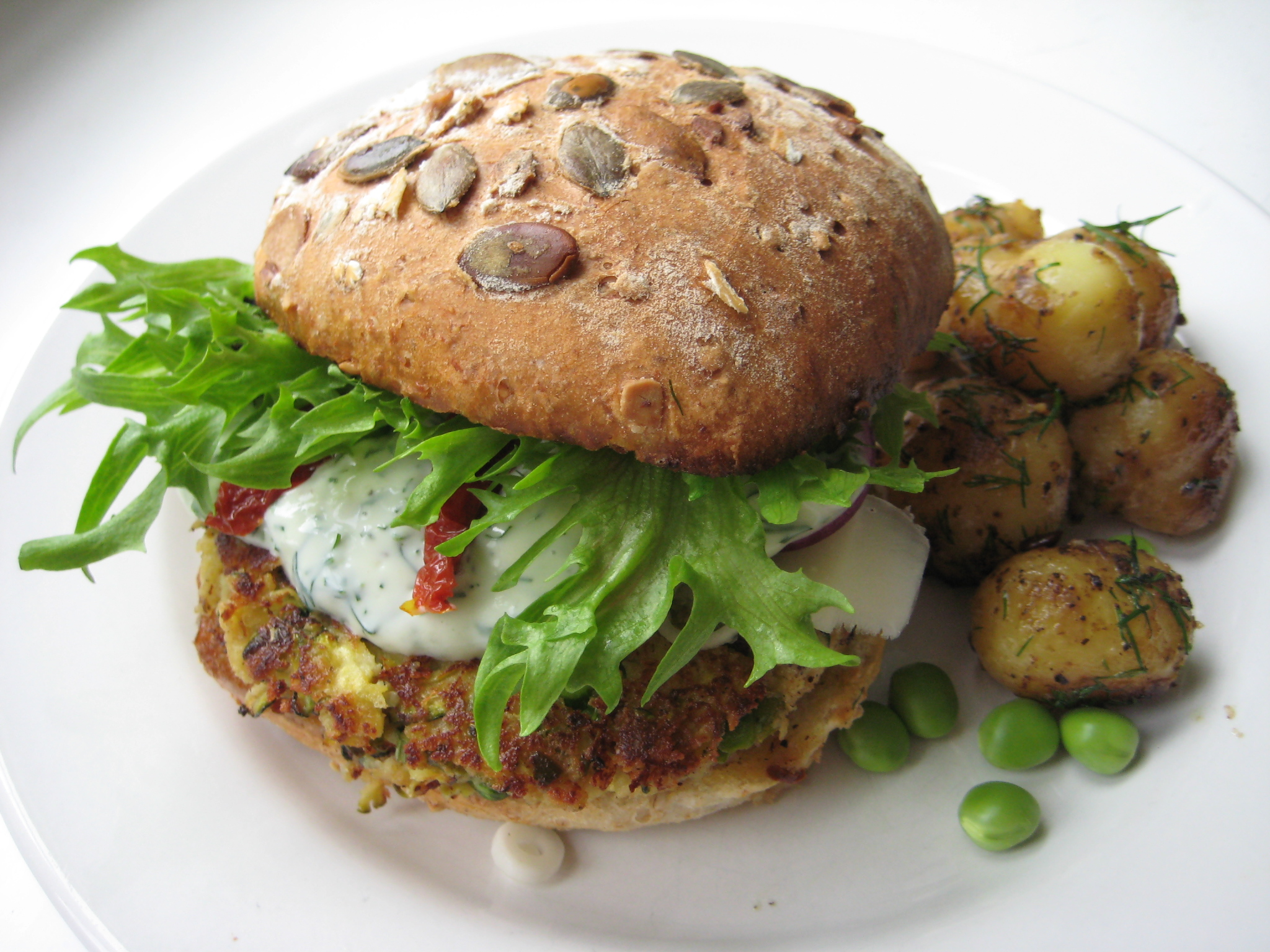
A vegetarian hamburger with roast potatoes

Comparison of the main vegetarian diets
	Meat	Dairy	Eggs	Honey
Lacto-ovo vegetarianism	No	Yes	Yes	Yes
Lacto vegetarianism	No	Yes	No	Yes
Ovo vegetarianism	No	No	Yes	Yes
Vegan diet	No	No	No	No

=== Primary classifications ===
- Lacto-ovo vegetarianism (or ovo-lacto vegetarianism) includes animal products such as dairy, eggs, and honey.
- Lacto vegetarianism includes dairy and honey but not eggs.
- Ovo vegetarianism includes eggs and honey but not dairy.
- Veganism excludes all animal flesh and by-products, such as dairy, eggs, and honey, edible bird's nests and items refined or manufactured through any such product, such as animal-tested baking soda or white sugar refined with bone char.

Within the "ovo-" groups, there are many who refuse to consume raw eggs (with balut being an extreme example); however, such distinction is typically not specifically addressed.

Some vegetarians also avoid products that may use animal ingredients not included in their labels or which use animal products in their manufacturing. For example, sugars that are whitened with bone char, cheeses that use animal rennet (enzymes from animal stomach lining), gelatin (derived from the collagen inside animals' skin, bones, and connective tissues), some sugar cane (but not beet sugar), and beverages (such as apple juice and alcohol) clarified with gelatin or crushed shellfish and isinglass, while other vegetarians are unaware of, or do not mind, such ingredients. In the 21st century, 90% of rennet and chymosin used in cheesemaking are derived from industrial fermentation processes, which satisfy both kosher and halal requirements.

=== Restrictive plant-based diets ===
- Fruitarianism only permits fruit, nuts, seeds, and other plant matter that can be gathered without harming the plant.
- Macrobiotic diets mostly consist of whole grains and beans.
- Raw veganism includes only fresh and uncooked fruit, nuts, seeds, and vegetables. Food must not be heated above 118 °F (48 °C) to be considered "raw". Usually, raw vegan food is only ever "cooked" with a food dehydrator at low temperatures.

=== Cultural and ecological variations ===
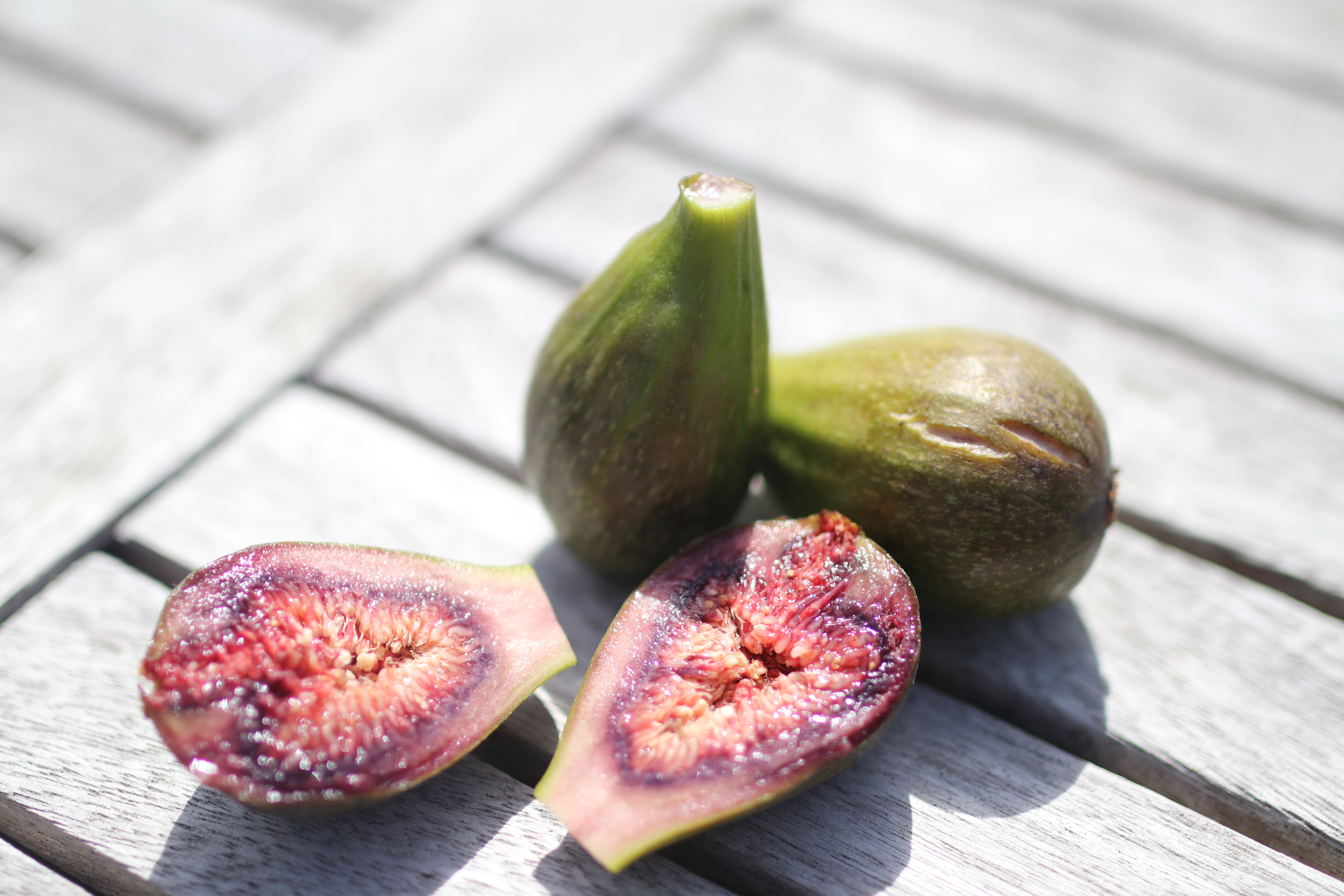
Fresh fig halves on wooden surface

Sattvic diet (also known as yogic diet), a plant-based diet which may also include dairy and honey, but excludes eggs, red lentils, durian, mushrooms, alliums, blue cheeses, fermented foods or sauces, and alcoholic drinks. Coffee, black or green tea, chocolate, nutmeg, and any other type of stimulant (including excessively pungent spices) are sometimes excluded, as well.

Jain vegetarianism is a strict form of lacto-vegetarianism. It excludes meat, eggs, and honey, but it also excludes root vegetables and bulbs, such as potatoes, onions, and garlic. This is because ancient Jain botanical classifications identified these underground plant parts as hosts for dense colonies of microscopic life forms, known as nigoda. Because of this, the Jain diet is one of the earliest recorded food systems designed around microbiological conservation, extending the rule of nonviolence to micro-ecosystems.

Beyond the exclusion of root vegetables, the Jain diet further restricts several specific plant categories based on early biological conservation principles:

- Multi-seeded and symbiotic fruits: Fruits such as figs are excluded due to their symbiotic relationship with pollinating wasps, which often die inside the fruit. Eggplant (brinjal) is also historically restricted due to its high susceptibility to internal pests and its classification as containing numerous germ-cells (bahu-beej).
- Fungi and aquatic roots: Mushrooms are strictly excluded as they are non-photosynthetic organisms that grow on decaying matter. Aquatic stems, such as the lotus root, are avoided because their extraction violently disrupts mud-dwelling aquatic organisms.
- Micro-habitats: Vegetables with dense, overlapping leaves or tight florets, such as cabbage, cauliflower, and broccoli, are traditionally avoided because their complex structures harbor insect colonies that cannot be removed without causing harm.

This comprehensive application of nonviolence (ahimsa) also extended beyond food into early forms of ethical consumerism. Historically, Jain ethical codes for the lay community explicitly prohibited participation in the fifteen forbidden trades (karmadanas), which legally barred Jains from manufacturing, selling, or utilizing non-dietary animal products such as leather, ivory, fur, and traditional silk. This strict avoidance of animal byproducts established an ancient historical precedent for the lifestyle practices associated with modern veganism.

=== Semi-vegetarian diets ===
Comparison of selected vegetarian and non-vegetarian diets
		Plants and seeds	Dairy	Eggs	Honey	Birds	Seafood and freshwater fish	All other animals
Vegetarianism	Lacto-ovo vegetarianism	Yes	Yes	Yes	Yes	No	No	No
Vegetarianism	Lacto vegetarianism	Yes	Yes	No	Yes	No	No	No
Vegetarianism	Ovo vegetarianism	Yes	No	Yes	Yes	No	No	No
Vegetarianism	Jain vegetarianism	Yes	Yes	No	No	No	No	No
Vegetarianism	Veganism	Yes	No	No	No	No	No	No
Non-vegetarianism	Flexitarianism	Yes	Yes	Yes	Yes	Sometimes	Sometimes	Sometimes
Non-vegetarianism	Pollotarianism	Yes	Maybe	Maybe	Yes	Yes	No	No
Non-vegetarianism	Pescetarianism	Yes	Maybe	Maybe	Yes	No	Yes	No

Individuals sometimes label themselves "vegetarian" while practicing a semi-vegetarian diet, as some dictionary definitions describe vegetarianism as sometimes including the consumption of fish, or only include mammalian flesh as part of their definition of meat, while other definitions exclude fish and all animal flesh. In other cases, individuals may describe themselves as "flexitarian". These diets may be followed by those who reduce animal flesh consumed as a way of transitioning to a complete vegetarian diet or for health, ethical, environmental, or other reasons. Semi-vegetarian diets include:

- Pescetarianism, which includes fish and possibly other forms of seafood.
- Pollotarianism, which includes chicken and possibly other poultry.

Semi-vegetarianism is contested by vegetarian groups, such as the Vegetarian Society, which states that vegetarianism excludes all animal flesh.

In India, eggs are conventionally classified as non-vegetarian; under Food Safety and Standards Authority of India labeling rules, packaged foods containing egg must carry the brown non-vegetarian mark.

== Health research ==
On average, vegetarians consume a lower proportion of calories from fat (particularly saturated fatty acids), fewer overall calories, more fiber, potassium, and vitamin C, than do non-vegetarians. Vegetarians generally have a lower body mass index. These characteristics and other lifestyle factors associated with a vegetarian diet may contribute to the positive health outcomes that have been identified among vegetarians.

— Dietary Guidelines for Americans, 2010 – A report issued by the U.S. Department of Agriculture and the U.S. Department of Health and Human Services

Countries' positions on vegetarian diets within their food-based dietary guidelines: Supporters Informers Uninformed Critics No guidelines Guideline not analysed

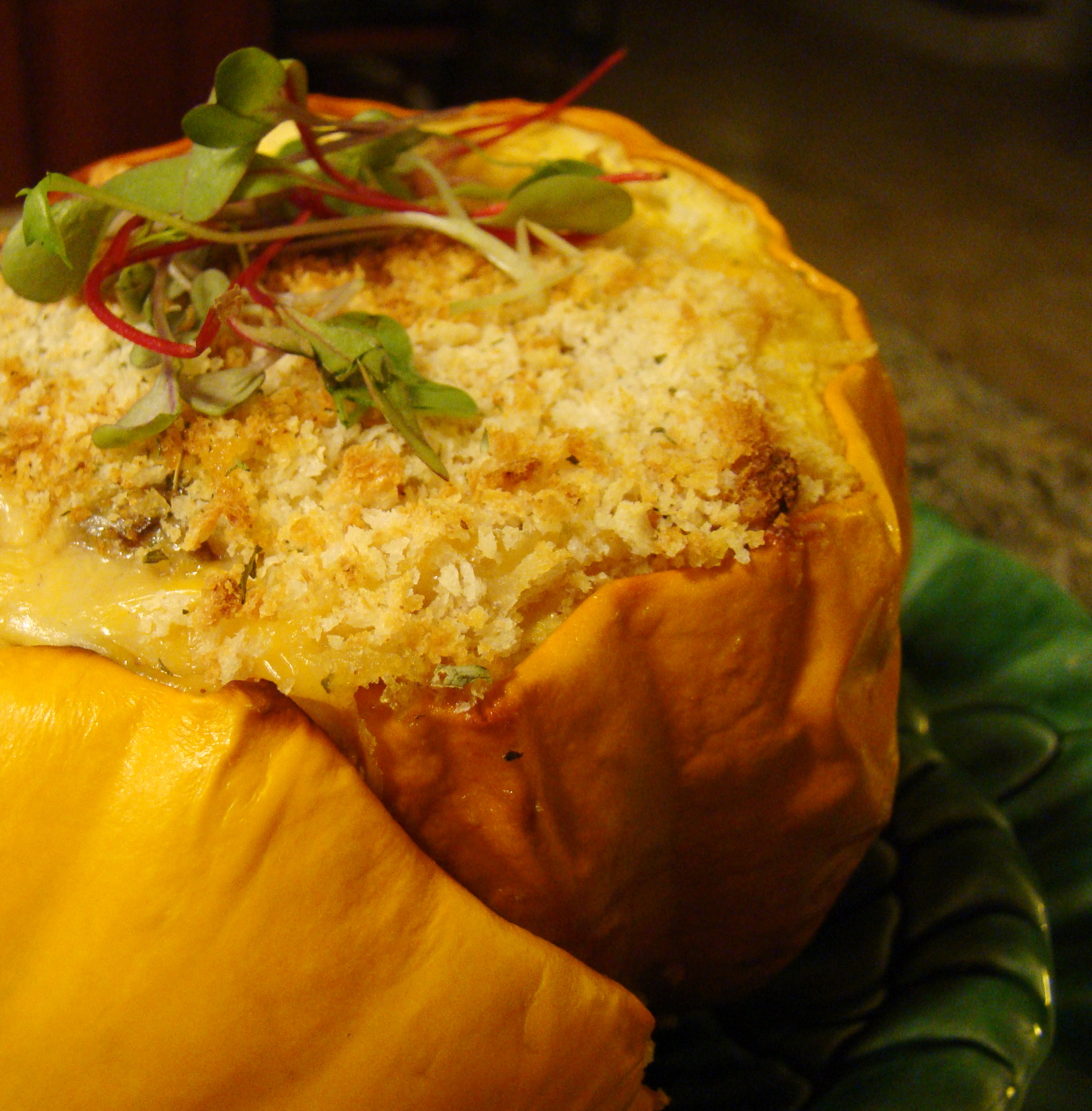
Acorn noodle soup

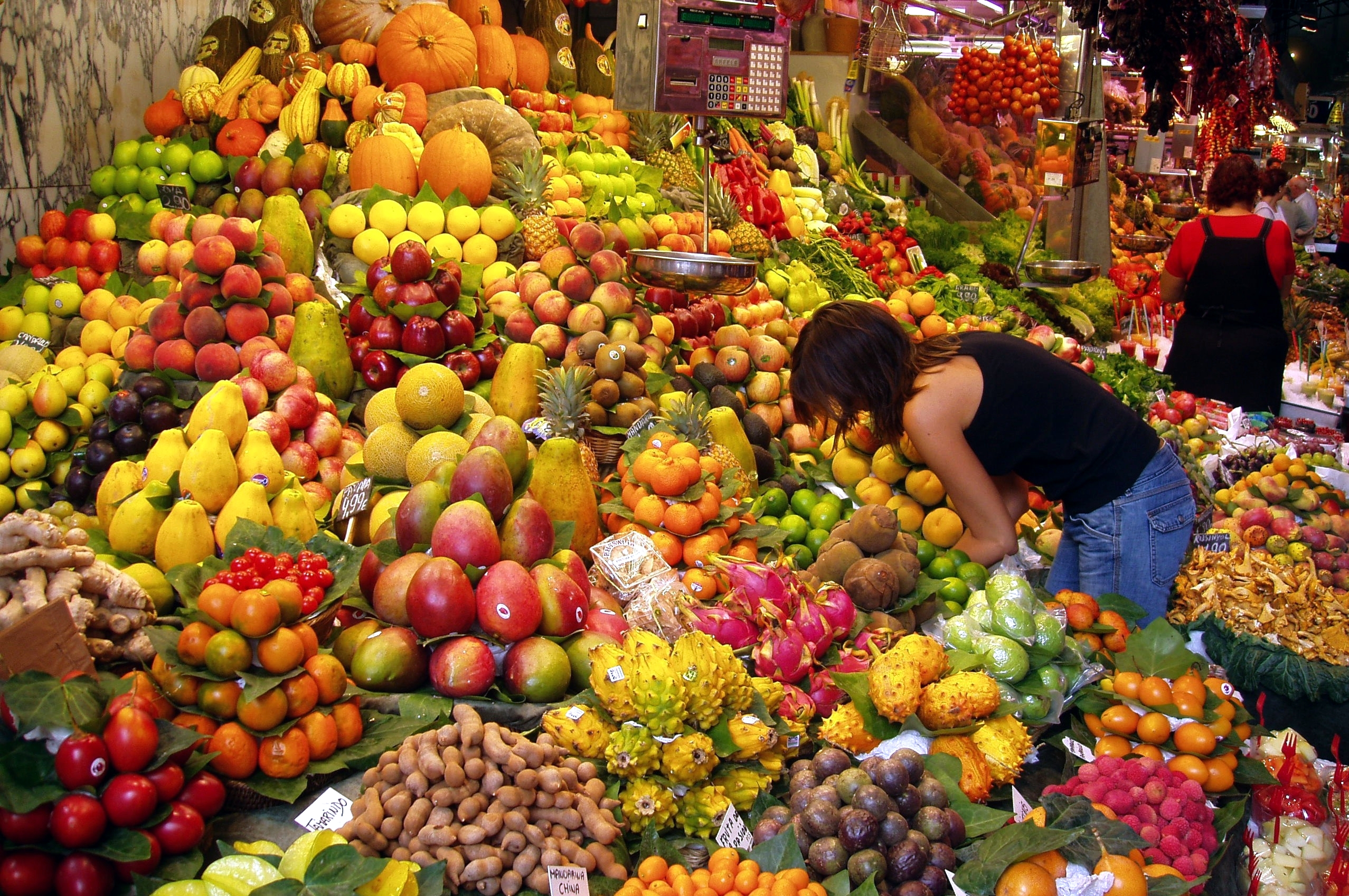
A fruit stall in Barcelona

In Western countries, the most common motive for people practicing vegetarianism is health consciousness. The Academy of Nutrition and Dietetics has stated that at all stages of life, a properly planned vegetarian diet can be "healthful, nutritionally adequate, and may be beneficial in the prevention and treatment of certain diseases." Vegetarian diets offer lower levels of saturated fat, cholesterol and animal protein, and higher levels of carbohydrates, fibre, magnesium, potassium, folate, vitamins C and E, and phytochemicals.

=== Bones ===
Studies have shown that a (non-lacto) vegetarian diet may increase the risk of calcium deficiency and low bone mineral density. A 2019 review found that vegetarians have lower bone mineral density at the femoral neck and lumbar spine compared to omnivores. A 2020 meta-analysis found that infants fed a lacto-vegetarian diet exhibited normal growth and development. A 2021 review found no differences in growth between vegetarian and meat-eating children. A 2025 systematic review and meta-analysis of 59 studies covering 48,626 children and adolescents found that well-planned lacto-ovo-vegetarian and vegan diets can support healthy growth and were associated with improved cardiovascular risk markers, but carried a higher risk of shortfalls in vitamin B_{12}, vitamin D, calcium, iron, and zinc when not addressed through fortified foods or supplements.

=== Diabetes ===
Vegetarian diets are under preliminary research for their potential to help people with type 2 diabetes.

=== Cardiovascular system ===
Meta-analyses have reported a reduced risk of death from ischemic heart disease and from cerebrovascular disease among vegetarians. A 2023 systematic review and meta-analysis of prospective cohort studies found that vegetarian diets were associated with a reduced risk of cardiovascular disease overall and of ischemic heart disease in particular, while evidence for stroke was less clear.

=== Mental health ===
Reviews of vegan and vegetarian diets showed a possible association with depression and anxiety, particularly among people under the age of 26. However, another review found no significant associations between a vegetarian diet and depression or anxiety.

=== Eating disorders ===
The American Dietetic Association discussed that vegetarian diets may be more common among adolescents with eating disorders, indicating that vegetarian diets do not cause eating disorders, but rather "vegetarian diets may be selected to camouflage an existing eating disorder".

=== Mortality risk ===
A 2012 study found a significantly lower ischemic heart disease mortality (-29%) and overall cancer incidence (-18%) in vegetarians in comparison to nonvegetarians. A 2017 review found a lower mortality (−25%) from ischemic heart disease.

== Diet composition and nutrition ==
Western vegetarian diets are typically high in carotenoids, but relatively low in omega-3 fatty acids and vitamin B_{12}. Vegans can have particularly low intake of vitamin B and calcium if they do not eat enough items such as collard greens, leafy greens, tempeh and tofu (soy). High levels of dietary fiber, folic acid, vitamins C and E, and magnesium, and low consumption of saturated fat are all considered to be beneficial aspects of a vegetarian diet. A well planned vegetarian diet will provide all nutrients in a meat-eater's diet to the same level for all stages of life.

=== Protein ===
Protein intake in vegetarian diets tends to be lower than in meat diets but can meet the daily requirements for most people. Studies at Harvard University as well as other studies conducted in the United States, United Kingdom, Canada, Australia, New Zealand, and various European countries, confirmed that vegetarian diets provide sufficient protein intake as long as a variety of plant sources are available and consumed.

=== Iron ===
Vegetarian diets typically contain amounts of iron similar to or higher than non-vegetarian diets, but the iron they provide is entirely non-heme, which is absorbed less efficiently than the heme iron found in meat, poultry, and seafood. For this reason, the Food and Nutrition Board of the National Academies sets the iron requirement for people following vegetarian diets at 1.8 times the Recommended Dietary Allowance for those who eat animal products. In estimating these values, mixed Western diets containing meat and ascorbic acid were judged to be about 15% bioavailable, while diets based mainly on cereals and vegetables were judged to be 10% bioavailable and very restricted vegetarian diets 5% bioavailable.

Absorption of non-heme iron is strongly affected by other components of the same meal. Vitamin C and other organic acids increase absorption, so pairing iron-rich plant foods with citrus fruit, tomatoes, peppers, or broccoli improves uptake, while phytic acid in whole grains, legumes, nuts, and seeds, along with polyphenols in tea and coffee and high doses of calcium, inhibit it. Soaking, sprouting, and fermenting legumes and grains reduce their phytate content and improve iron availability.

Plant foods that contribute meaningfully to iron intake include lentils, white beans, kidney beans, chickpeas, soybeans, and tofu, spinach, cashews, pumpkin seeds, raisins, dark chocolate, and fortified breakfast cereals and breads, the last of which are among the largest sources of iron in fortified food supplies. Vegan diets are often higher in iron than lacto-ovo vegetarian diets, because dairy products contain very little iron and can displace iron-containing foods from the diet.

Iron stores, as measured by serum ferritin, tend to be lower in vegetarians than in non-vegetarians, and some small studies have reported high rates of depleted iron stores in particular groups, such as female vegans. Lower ferritin within the normal range is not itself harmful, and the Academy of Nutrition and Dietetics states that rates of iron-deficiency anemia among vegetarians are similar to those among non-vegetarians. Premenopausal women, pregnant women, infants, and adolescents have the highest requirements and are the groups for whom vegetarian diets most often warrant attention to iron intake or supplementation.

=== Vitamin B_{12} ===
Vitamin B_{12} is not generally present in plants but is naturally found in foods of animal origin. Lacto-ovo vegetarians can obtain B_{12} from dairy products and eggs, and vegans can obtain it from manufactured fortified foods (including plant-based products and breakfast cereals) and dietary supplements. A strict vegan diet avoiding consumption of all animal products risks vitamin B_{12} deficiency, which can lead to hyperhomocysteinemia, a risk factor for several health disorders, including anemia, neurological deficits, gastrointestinal problems, platelet disorders, and increased risk for cardiovascular diseases. The recommended daily dietary intake of B_{12} in the United States and Canada is 0.4 mcg (ages 0–6 months), rising to 1.8 mcg (9–13 years), 2.4 mcg (14+ years), and 2.8 mcg (lactating female). While the body's daily requirement for vitamin B_{12} is in microgram amounts, deficiency of the vitamin through strict practice of a vegetarian diet without supplementation can increase the risk of several chronic diseases.

A 2024 randomized controlled trial conducted in Taiwan found that consuming 5 grams of roasted purple laver (nori) daily for four weeks significantly improved vitamin B12 levels in vegetarians.

=== Fatty acids ===
Plant-based, or vegetarian, sources of Omega 3 fatty acids include soy, walnuts, pumpkin seeds, canola oil, kiwifruit, hempseed, algae, chia seed, flaxseed, echium seed and leafy vegetables such as lettuce, spinach, cabbage and purslane. Purslane contains more Omega 3 than any other known leafy green. Olives (and olive oil) are another important plant source of unsaturated fatty acids. Plant foods can provide alpha-linolenic acid which the human body uses to synthesize the long-chain n-3 fatty acids EPA and DHA. EPA and DHA can be obtained directly in high amounts from oily fish, fish oil, or algae oil. Vegetarians, and particularly vegans, have lower levels of EPA and DHA than meat-eaters. While the health effects of low levels of EPA and DHA are unknown, it is unlikely that supplementation with alpha-linolenic acid will significantly increase levels.. Significantly, for vegetarians, certain algae such as spirulina are good sources of gamma-linolenic acid (GLA), alpha-linolenic acid (ALA), linoleic acid (LA), stearidonic acid (SDA), eicosapentaenoic acid (EPA), docosahexaenoic acid (DHA), and arachidonic acid (AA).

=== Calcium ===
Calcium intake in vegetarians and vegans can be similar to non-vegetarians, as long as the diet is properly planned. Lacto-ovo vegetarians that include dairy products can still obtain calcium from dairy sources like milk, yogurt, and cheese.

Non-dairy milks that are fortified with calcium, such as soymilk and almond milk can also contribute a significant amount of calcium in the diet. Broccoli, bok choy, and kale have also been found to have calcium that is well absorbed in the body. Though the calcium content per serving is lower in these vegetables than a glass of milk, the absorption of the calcium into the body is higher. Other foods that contain calcium include calcium-set tofu, blackstrap molasses, turnip greens, mustard greens, soybeans, tempeh, almonds, okra, dried figs, and tahini. Though calcium can be found in Spinach, swiss chard, beans and beet greens, they are generally not considered to be a good source since the calcium binds to oxalic acid and is poorly absorbed into the body. Phytic acid found in nuts, seeds, and beans may also impact calcium absorption rates. See the National Institutes of Health Office of Dietary Supplements for calcium needs for various ages, the Vegetarian Resource Group and the Vegetarian Nutrition Calcium Fact Sheet from the Academy of Nutrition and Dietetics for more specifics on how to obtain adequate calcium intake on a vegetarian or vegan diet.

=== Vitamin D ===
Vitamin D needs can be met via the human body's own generation upon sufficient and sensible exposure to ultraviolet (UV) light in sunlight. Products including milk, soy milk and cereal grains may be fortified to provide a source of vitamin D. For those who do not get adequate sun exposure or food sources, vitamin D supplementation may be necessary.

==== Vitamin D_{2} ====
- Plants
  - Alfalfa (Medicago sativa subsp. sativa), shoot: 4.8 μg (192 IU) vitamin D_{2}, 0.1 μg (4 IU) vitamin D_{3}
- Fungus, from USDA nutrient database, per 100 g:
  - Mushrooms, portabella, exposed to ultraviolet light, raw: Vitamin D_{2}: 11.2 μg (446 IU)
  - Mushrooms, portabella, exposed to ultraviolet light, grilled: Vitamin D_{2}: 13.1 μg (524 IU)
  - Mushrooms, shiitake, dried: Vitamin D_{2}: 3.9 μg (154 IU)
  - Mushrooms, shiitake, raw: Vitamin D_{2}: 0.4 μg (18 IU)
  - Mushrooms, portabella, raw: Vitamin D_{2}: 0.3 μg (10 IU)
  - Mushroom powder, any species, illuminated with sunlight or artificial ultraviolet light sources

Vitamin D_{2}, or ergocalciferol is found in fungus (except alfalfa which is a plantae) and created from viosterol, which in turn is created when ultraviolet light activates ergosterol (which is found in fungi and named as a sterol from ergot). Any UV-irradiated fungus including yeast form vitamin D_{2}. Human bioavailability of vitamin D_{2} from vitamin D_{2}-enhanced button mushrooms via UV-B irradiation is effective in improving vitamin D status and not different from a vitamin D_{2} supplement according to study. For example, vitamin D_{2} from UV-irradiated yeast baked into bread is bioavailable. By visual assessment or using a chromometer, no significant discoloration of irradiated mushrooms, as measured by the degree of "whiteness", was observed making it hard to discover if they have been treated without labeling. Claims have been made that a normal serving (approx. 3 oz or 1/2 cup, or 60 grams) of mushrooms treated with ultraviolet light increase their vitamin D content to levels up to 80 micrograms, or 2700 IU if exposed to just 5 minutes of UV light after being harvested.

=== Choline ===
Choline is a nutrient that helps transfer signals between nerve cells and is involved in liver function. It is highest in dairy foods and meat but it is possible to be obtained through a vegan diet.

Plant-based sources of choline include roasted soybeans, shiitake mushrooms, potatoes, beans, nuts, seeds, and cruciferous vegetables.

== Ethics and diet ==
=== General ===
With regard to the ethics of eating meat, scholars consider vegetarianism an ideology and a social movement. Ethical reasons for choosing vegetarianism vary and are usually predicated on the interests of non-human animals. In many societies, controversies and debates have arisen over the ethics of eating animals. Some people, while not vegetarians, refuse to eat the flesh of certain animals due to cultural taboo, such as cats, dogs, horses or rabbits. Others support meat eating for scientific, nutritional and cultural reasons, including religious ones. Some meat eaters abstain from the meat of animals reared in particular ways, such as factory farms, or avoid certain meats, such as veal or foie gras. Some people follow vegetarian or vegan diets not because of moral concerns involving the raising or consumption of animals in general, but because of concerns about the specific treatment and practices involved in the processing of animals for food. Others still avoid meat out of concern that meat production places a greater burden on the environment than production of an equivalent amount of plant protein. Ethical objections based on consideration for animals are generally divided into opposition to the act of killing in general, and opposition to certain agricultural practices surrounding the production of meat.

Within the Jain ethical framework, the prohibition against eating meat extends beyond the physical act of killing (dravya-himsa) to the psychological intent behind it (bhava-himsa). This is academically illustrated through the classical Jain narrative of King Yashodhara and the dough rooster. In this ethical parable, a king compromises with a demand for ritual animal sacrifice by offering a rooster made of flour. However, Jain theology dictates that because the psychological intent to kill was present, the spiritual degradation was identical to killing a living creature. Scholars note that this narrative was historically utilized to establish that the institutionalization of meat-eating corrupts the psychological purity of a society, regardless of who physically butchers the animal.

=== Ethics of killing for food ===
Ethical vegetarians believe that killing an animal, like killing a human, especially one who has equal or lesser cognitive abilities than the animals in question, can only be justified in extreme circumstances and that consuming a living creature for its enjoyable taste, convenience, or nutrition value is not a sufficient cause. Another common view is that humans are morally conscious of their behavior in a way other animals are not, and therefore subject to higher standards. Jeff McMahan proposes that denying the right to life and humane treatment to animals with equal or greater cognitive abilities than mentally disabled humans is an arbitrary and discriminatory practice based on habit instead of logic. Opponents of ethical vegetarianism argue that animals are not moral equals to humans and so consider the comparison of eating livestock with killing people to be fallacious. This view does not excuse cruelty, but maintains that animals do not possess the rights a human has.

=== Dairy and eggs ===
One of the main differences between a vegan and a lacto-ovo vegetarian diet is the avoidance of both eggs and dairy products such as milk, cheese, butter and yogurt. Ethical vegans do not consume dairy or eggs because they state that their production causes the animal suffering or a premature death.

To produce milk from dairy cattle, farmers separate calves from their mothers soon after birth to retain cow milk for human consumption.

=== Treatment of animals ===
Jain communities established large-scale systems for animal welfare long ago. Jain merchants funded the creation of panjrapoles—specialized animal shelters and hospitals across India designed to care for sick, old, or rescued livestock and birds. The motivation behind these early shelters was not modern ethical philosophy, but the core Jain religious belief that committing violence against any living creature directly harms a person's own soul and spiritual purity.

Ethical vegetarianism has become popular in developed countries particularly because of the spread of factory farming and environmental consciousness. Some believe that the current mass-demand for meat cannot be satisfied without a mass-production system that disregards the welfare of animals, while others believe that practices like well-managed free-range farming or the consumption of game (particularly from species whose natural predators have been significantly eliminated) could substantially alleviate consumer demand for mass-produced meat.

== Religion and diet ==
Jainism teaches vegetarianism as moral conduct, as do some sects of Hinduism. Buddhism in general does not prohibit meat eating, but Mahayana Buddhism encourages vegetarianism as beneficial for developing compassion. Other denominations that advocate a vegetarian diet include the Seventh-day Adventists, the Rastafari movement, the Ananda Marga movement and the Hare Krishnas. Sikhism does not equate spirituality with diet and does not specify a vegetarian or meat diet.

=== Baháʼí Faith ===
While there are no dietary restrictions in the Baháʼí Faith, `Abdu'l-Bahá, the son of the religion's founder, noted that a vegetarian diet consisting of fruits and grains was desirable, except for people with a weak constitution or those that are sick. He stated that there are no requirements that Baháʼís become vegetarian, but that a future society should gradually become vegetarian. `Abdu'l-Bahá also stated that killing animals was contrary to compassion. While Shoghi Effendi, the head of the Bahá'í Faith in the first half of the 20th century, stated that a purely vegetarian diet would be preferable since it avoided killing animals, both he and the Universal House of Justice, the governing body of the Baháʼís have stated that these teachings do not constitute a Baháʼí practice and that Baháʼís can choose to eat whatever they wish but should be respectful of others' beliefs.

=== Buddhism ===
Theravadins in general eat meat. If Buddhist monks "see, hear or know" a living animal was killed specifically for them to eat, they must refuse it or else incur an offense. However, this does not include eating meat which was given as alms or commercially purchased. In the Theravada canon, Shakyamuni Buddha did not make any comment discouraging them from eating meat (except specific types, such as human, elephant, horse, dog, snake, lion, tiger, leopard, bear, and hyena flesh) but he specifically refused to institute vegetarianism in his monastic code when a suggestion had been made. (Note: "The rule of vegetarianism was the fifth of a list of rules which Devadatta had proposed to the Buddha. Devadatta was the founder of the tapasa movement in Buddhism and his special rules involved ascetic and austere practices (forest-dwelling, wearing only rags, etc). The Buddha rejected all the proposed revisions of Devadatta, and it was in this context that he reiterated the tikoiparisuddha rule. (On this see the author's Western Buddhism and a Theravada heterodoxy, BSQ Tracts on Buddhism.")

In several Sanskrit texts of Mahayana Buddhism, Buddha instructs his followers to avoid meat. However, each branch of Mahayana Buddhism selects which sutra to follow, and some branches, including the majority of Tibetan and Japanese Buddhists, actually do eat meat.

Meanwhile, Chinese, Korean, Vietnamese Buddhism (in some sectors of East Asian Buddhism) monks and nuns are expected to abstain from meat, and traditionally, to abstain from eggs and dairy as well.

Different Buddhist traditions have differing teachings on diet, which may also vary for ordained monks and nuns compared to others. Many interpret the precept "not to kill" to require abstinence from meat, but not all. In Taiwan, su vegetarianism excludes not only all animal products but also vegetables in the allium family (which have the characteristic aroma of onion and garlic): onion, garlic, scallions, leeks, chives, or shallots.

=== Christianity ===
Various groups within Christianity have practiced specific dietary restrictions for various reasons. The Council of Jerusalem in around 50 AD, recommended Christians keep following some of the Jewish food laws concerning meat. The early sect known as the Ebionites are considered to have practiced vegetarianism. Surviving fragments from their Gospel indicate their belief that – as Christ is the Passover sacrifice and eating the Passover lamb is no longer required – a vegetarian diet may (or should) be observed. However, orthodox Christianity does not accept their teaching as authentic. Indeed, their specific injunction to strict vegetarianism was cited as one of the Ebionites' "errors".

The Bible Christian Church founded by Reverend William Cowherd in 1809 followed a vegetarian diet. Cowherd was one of the philosophical forerunners of the Vegetarian Society. Cowherd encouraged members to abstain from eating of meat as a form of temperance.

Seventh-day Adventists are encouraged to engage in healthy eating practices, and lacto-ovo-vegetarian diets are recommended by the General Conference of Seventh-day Adventists Nutrition Council (GCNC). They have also sponsored and participated in many scientific studies exploring the impact of dietary decisions upon health outcomes. The GCNC has in addition adapted the USDA's food pyramid for a vegetarian dietary approach. However, the only kinds of meat specifically frowned upon by the SDA health message are unclean meats, or those forbidden in scripture.

Additionally, some monastic orders follow a pescatarian diet, and members of the Eastern Orthodox Church follow a vegan diet during fasts. There is also a strong association between the Quakers and vegetarianism dating back at least to the 18th century. The association grew in prominence during the 19th century, coupled with growing Quaker concerns in connection with alcohol consumption, anti-vivisection and social purity. The association between the Quaker tradition and vegetarianism, however, becomes most significant with the founding of the Friends' Vegetarian Society in 1902 "to spread a kindlier way of living amongst the Society of Friends."

==== Seventh-day Adventist ====
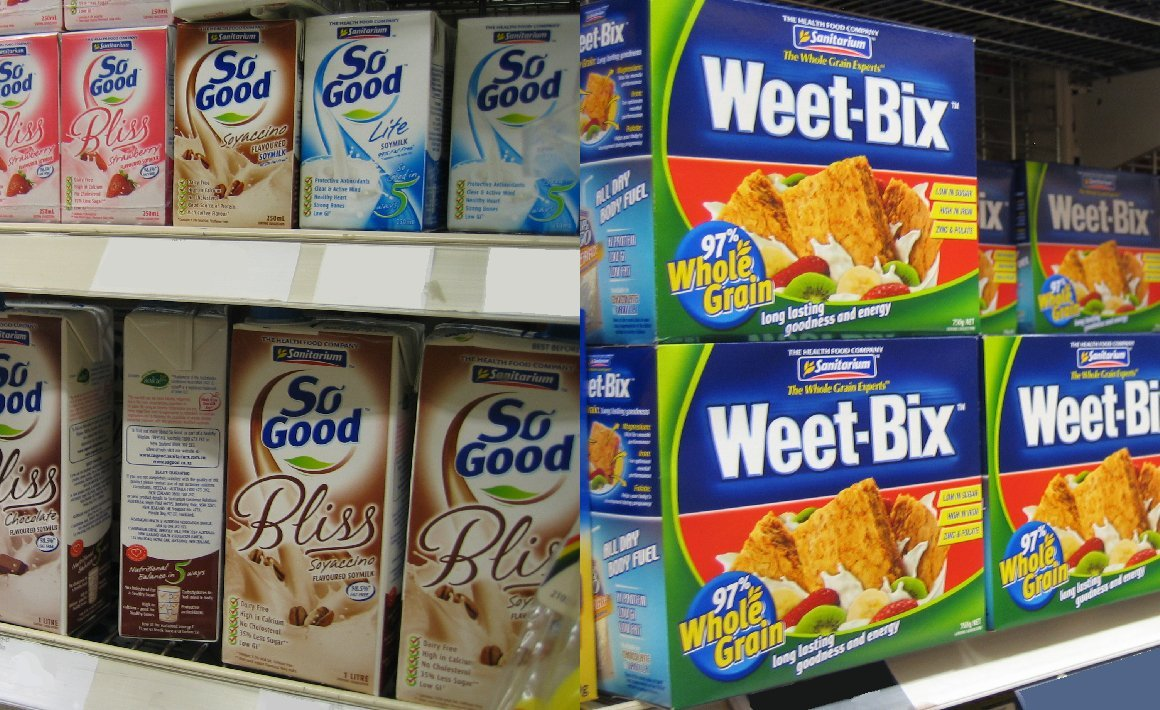
Sanitarium products for sale

The Seventh-day Adventist Church is well known for presenting a health message that recommends vegetarianism and expects adherence to the kosher laws in Leviticus 11. Obedience to these laws means abstinence from pork, shellfish, and other animals proscribed as "unclean". The church discourages its members from consuming alcoholic beverages, tobacco or illegal drugs (compare Christianity and alcohol). In addition, some Adventists avoid coffee, tea, cola, and other beverages containing caffeine.

The pioneers of the Adventist Church had much to do with the common acceptance of breakfast cereals into the Western diet, and the "modern commercial concept of cereal food" originated among Adventists. John Harvey Kellogg was one of the early founders of Adventist health work. His development of breakfast cereals as a health food led to the founding of Kellogg's by his brother William. In both Australia and New Zealand, the church-owned Sanitarium Health and Wellbeing Company is a leading manufacturer of health and vegetarian-related products, most prominently Weet-Bix. Kellogg encouraged his students Daniel H. Kress and Lauretta E. Kress to study medicine together at the University of Michigan Medical School and become public advocates of vegetarianism; together they published an important vegetarian cookbook and became early founders of what was later Washington Adventist Hospital.

Research funded by the U.S. National Institutes of Health has shown that the average Adventist in California lives 4 to 10 years longer than the average Californian. The research, as cited by the cover story of the November 2005 issue of National Geographic, asserts that Adventists live longer because they do not smoke or drink alcohol, have a day of rest every week, and maintain a healthy, low-fat vegetarian diet that is rich in nuts and beans. The cohesiveness of Adventists' social networks has also been put forward as an explanation for their extended lifespan. Since Dan Buettner's 2005 National Geographic story about Adventist longevity, his book, The Blue Zones: Lessons for Living Longer From the People Who've Lived the Longest, named Loma Linda, California, a "blue zone" because of the large concentration of Seventh-day Adventists. He cites the Adventist emphasis on health, diet, and Sabbath-keeping as primary factors for Adventist longevity.

An estimated 35% of Adventists practice vegetarianism or veganism, according to a 2002 worldwide survey of local church leaders. North American Adventist health study recruitments from 2001 to 2007 found a similar prevalence of vegetarianism/veganism. A small majority of Adventists, 54%, were conventional meat-eaters. Of the remaining 46% it was found that 28% were Ovo/Lacto-vegetarians, 10% were Pesco-vegetarians and 8% were vegans. It is common for Adventists who choose to eat meat to also eat plant-based foods; 6% of the "meat-eaters" group restricted their intake of meat/fish to no more than once per week.

=== Hinduism ===
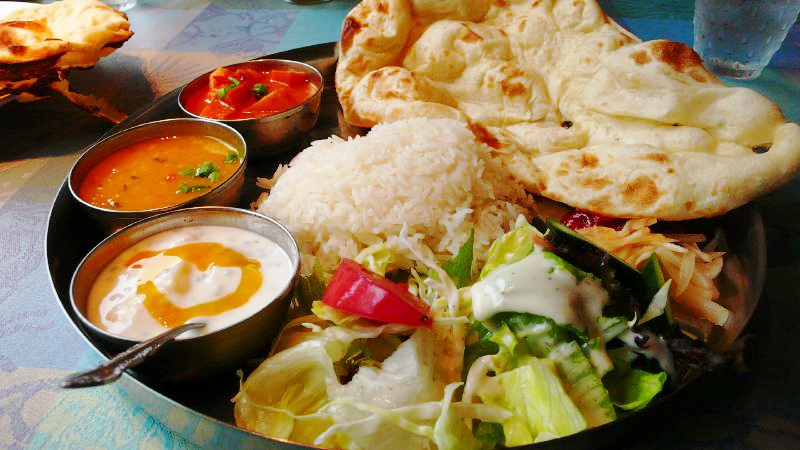
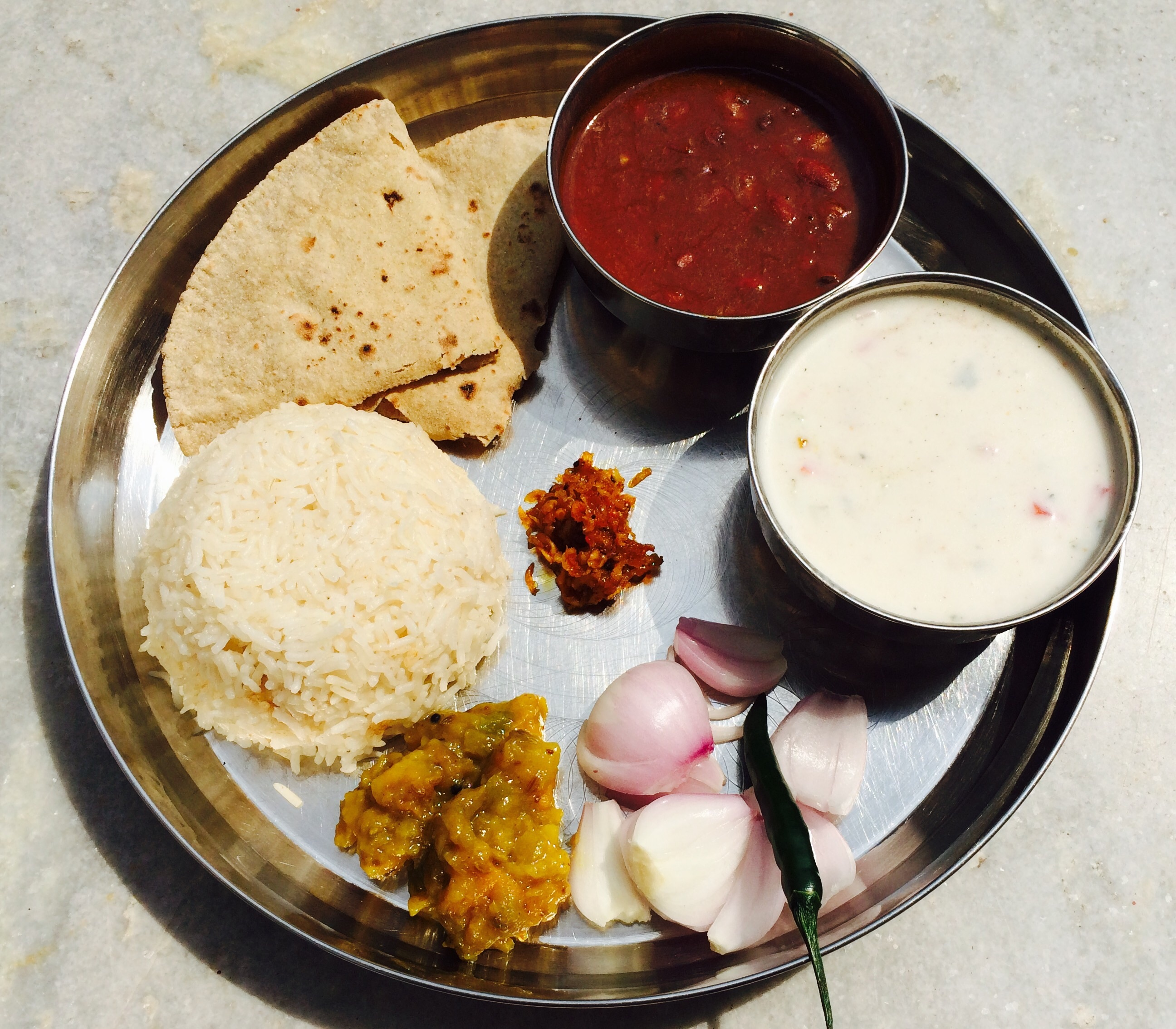
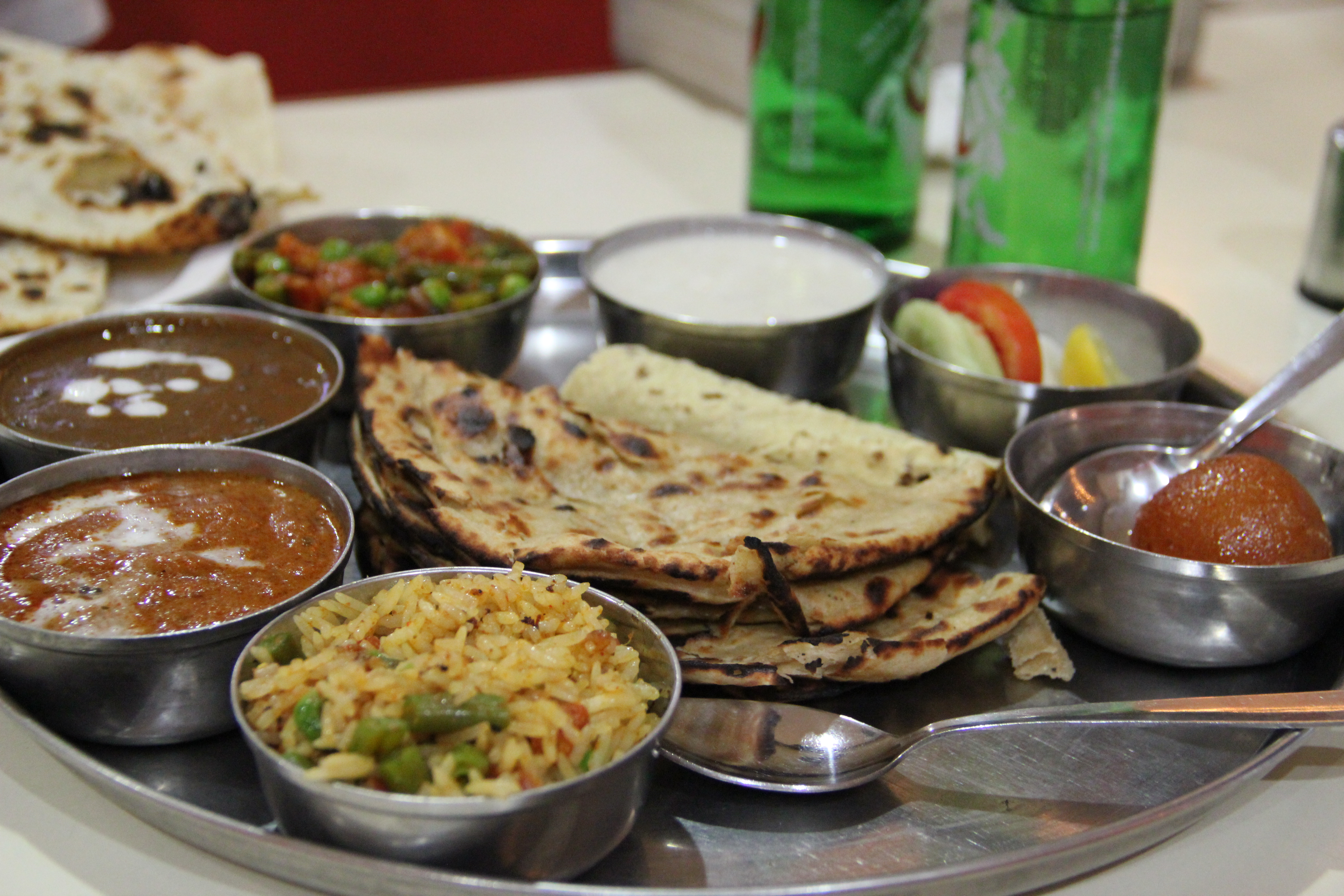
Illustrative of vegetarian Hindu meals

Though there is no strict rule on what to consume and what not to, the food habits of Hindus vary according to their specific caste and sub-caste, community, location, custom and varying traditions. Historically and currently, a majority of Hindus (about 70%) eat meat, while a large proportion of Hindus are vegetarian (about 30%).

Some sects of Hinduism such as Vaishnavism follow the purest form of vegetarianism as an ideal while Shaktism and Tantric sects freely consume chicken, mutton (goat and sheep meat), fish and eggs. The reasons stated by Jains and Vaishnavas are: the principle of nonviolence (ahimsa) applied to animals; the intention to offer only "pure" (vegetarian) food to a deity and then to receive it back as prasada; and the conviction that a sattvic diet is beneficial for a healthy body. A sattvic diet is lacto-vegetarian, which includes dairy, but excludes eggs. An overwhelming majority of the Hindus consider the cow to be a holy and sacred animal whose slaughter for meat is forbidden. Thus, beef is a taboo for the majority of Hindus, Jains and Sikhs

=== Islam ===
Some followers of Islam, or Muslims, chose to be vegetarian for health, ethical, or personal reasons. However, the choice to become vegetarian for non-medical reasons can sometimes be controversial due to conflicting fatwas and differing interpretations of the Quran. Though some more traditional Muslims may keep quiet about their vegetarian diet, the number of vegetarian Muslims is increasing.

Sri Lankan Sufi master Bawa Muhaiyaddeen, who established The Bawa Muhaiyaddeen Fellowship of North America in Philadelphia. The former Indian president Dr. A. P. J. Abdul Kalam was also famously a vegetarian.

In January 1996, The International Vegetarian Union announced the formation of the Muslim Vegetarian/Vegan Society.

Many non-vegetarian Muslims will select vegetarian (or seafood) options when dining in non-halal restaurants. However, this is a matter of not having the right kind of meat rather than preferring not to eat meat on the whole.

=== Jainism ===
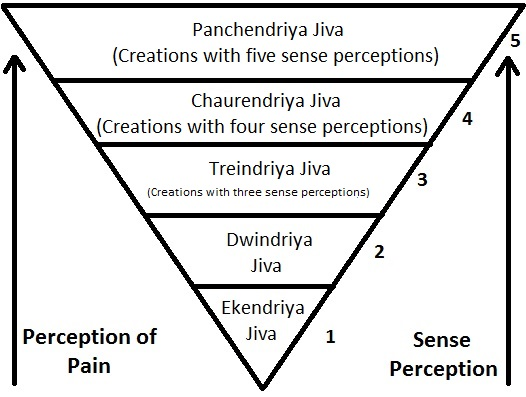
The food choices of Jains are based on the value of Ahimsa (non-violence).

Followers of Jainism practice a strict lacto-vegetarian diet deeply rooted in the fundamental ethical principle of nonviolence (ahimsa). Unlike many other dietary frameworks, Jain vegetarianism operates on a rigorous biological taxonomy that categorizes lifeforms by their number of sense organs, ranging from one-sensed organisms (ekendriya jiva, such as plants and water) to five-sensed beings (panchendriya jiva, such as mammals and humans). The overarching dietary goal is to completely eliminate violence against higher-sensed beings (meat, fish, and eggs) while strictly minimizing harm to single-sensed organisms and microscopic life.

To achieve this, the diet extends significantly beyond standard vegetarianism. Jains strictly avoid root and underground vegetables—such as potatoes, onions, and garlic—because harvesting them requires uprooting and killing the entire plant, and disrupts massive clusters of microscopic lifeforms (nigoda) that thrive in the soil and root systems. The consumption of honey is absolutely forbidden due to the violent disruption of the hive during extraction and because its viscous nature makes it a breeding ground for microorganisms. Similarly, fungi (mushrooms) and multi-seeded vegetables (like eggplant) are avoided to prevent the ingestion of mobile insects (trasa jiva) and microscopic life.

Furthermore, Jain dietary law prohibits the consumption of products derived from already-dead animals. This is not only to avoid the flesh itself, but because classical Jain biology asserts that decaying tissue instantly becomes a host for rapidly multiplying clusters of decomposing microorganisms, the ingestion of which results in massive karmic violence. Some particularly dedicated individuals are fruitarians.

=== Judaism ===
While classical Jewish law neither requires nor prohibits the consumption of meat, Jewish vegetarians often cite Jewish principles regarding animal welfare, environmental ethics, moral character, and health as reasons for adopting a vegetarian or vegan diet.

Rabbis may advocate vegetarianism or veganism primarily because of concerns about animal welfare, especially in light of the traditional prohibition on causing unnecessary "pain to living creatures" (tza'ar ba'alei hayyim). Some Jewish vegetarian groups and activists believe that the halakhic permission to eat meat is a temporary leniency for those who are not ready yet to accept the vegetarian diet.

The book of Daniel starts in its first chapter with the benefits of vegetarianism. Due to its size, its late time of origin and its revealing content, the book is of particular importance for the time of the following exile, which lasts now for 2000 years and technically still goes on until the Temple in Jerusalem is rebuilt. A diet described as "pulse and water" is presented along benefits such as accordance with the biblical dietary laws, health, beauty, wisdom and vision. Vegetarianism can be seen as a safeguard around the dietary laws or the beautification of them.

Jewish vegetarianism and veganism have become especially popular among Israeli Jews. In 2016, Israel was described as "the most vegan country on Earth", as five percent of its population eschewed all animal products. Interest in veganism has grown among both non-Orthodox and Orthodox Jews in Israel.

=== Rastafari ===
Within the Afro-Caribbean community, a minority are Rastafari and follow the dietary regulations with varying degrees of strictness. The most orthodox eat only "Ital" or natural foods, in which the matching of herbs or spices with vegetables is the result of long tradition originating from the African ancestry and cultural heritage of Rastafari. "Ital", which is derived from the word vital, means essential to human existence. Ital cooking in its strictest form prohibits the use of salt, meat (especially pork), preservatives, colorings, flavorings and anything artificial. Most Rastafari are vegetarian.

=== Sikhism ===
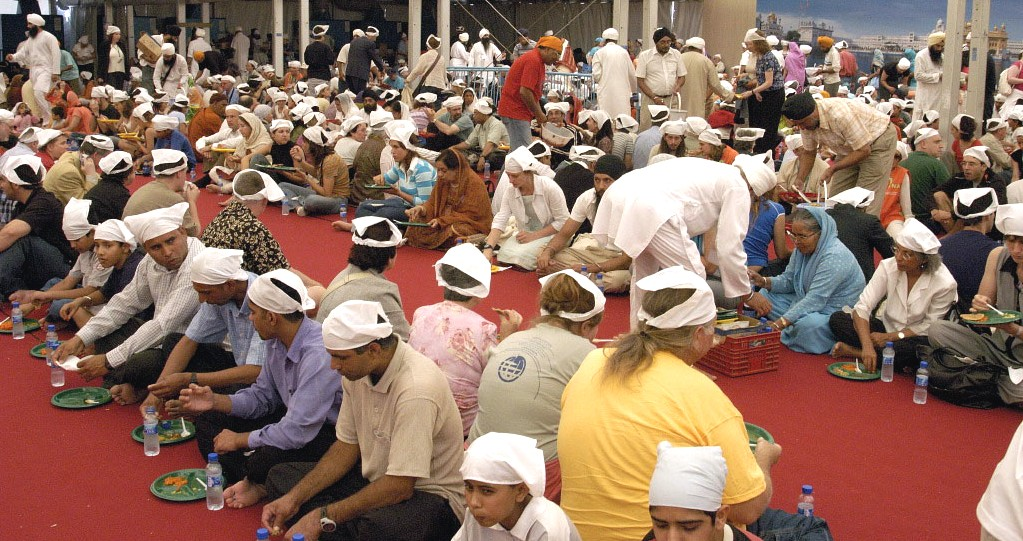
At the Sikh langar, all people eat a vegetarian meal as equals.

The tenets of Sikhism do not advocate a particular stance on either vegetarianism or the consumption of meat, but leave the decision of diet to the individual. The tenth guru, Guru Gobind Singh, however, prohibited "Amritdhari" Sikhs, or those that follow the Sikh Rehat Maryada (the Official Sikh Code of Conduct) from eating Kutha meat, or meat which has been obtained from animals which have been killed in a ritualistic way. This is understood to have been for the political reason of maintaining independence from the then-new Muslim hegemony, as Muslims largely adhere to the ritualistic halal diet.

"Amritdharis" that belong to some Sikh sects (e.g. Akhand Kirtani Jatha, Damdami Taksal, Namdhari and Rarionwalay, etc.) are vehemently against the consumption of meat and eggs (though they do consume and encourage the consumption of milk, butter and cheese). This vegetarian stance has been traced back to the times of the British Raj, with the advent of many new Vaishnava converts. In response to the varying views on diet throughout the Sikh population, Sikh Gurus have sought to clarify the Sikh view on diet, stressing their preference only for simplicity of diet. Guru Nanak said that over-consumption of food (Lobh, Greed) involves a drain on the Earth's resources and thus on life. Passages from the Guru Granth Sahib (the holy book of Sikhs, also known as the Adi Granth) say that it is "foolish" to argue for the superiority of animal life, because though all life is related, only human life carries more importance: "Only fools argue whether to eat meat or not. Who can define what is meat and what is not meat? Who knows where the sin lies, being a vegetarian or a non-vegetarian?" The Sikh langar, or free temple meal, is largely lacto-vegetarian, though this is understood to be a result of efforts to present a meal that is respectful of the diets of any person who would wish to dine, rather than out of dogma.

== Environment and diet ==
Environmental vegetarianism is based on the concern that the production of meat and animal products for mass consumption, especially through factory farming, is environmentally unsustainable. According to a 2006 United Nations initiative, the livestock industry is one of the largest contributors to environmental degradation worldwide, and modern practices of raising animals for food contribute on a "massive scale" to air and water pollution, land degradation, climate change, and loss of biodiversity. The initiative concluded that "the livestock sector emerges as one of the top two or three most significant contributors to the most serious environmental problems, at every scale from local to global."

In addition, animal agriculture is a large source of greenhouse gases. According to a 2006 report it is responsible for 18% of the world's greenhouse gas emissions as estimated in 100-year CO_{2} equivalents. Livestock sources (including enteric fermentation and manure) account for about 3.1 percent of US anthropogenic GHG emissions expressed as carbon dioxide equivalents. This EPA estimate is based on methodologies agreed to by the Conference of Parties of the UNFCCC, with 100-year global warming potentials from the IPCC Second Assessment Report used in estimating GHG emissions as carbon dioxide equivalents.

Meat produced in a laboratory (called in vitro meat) may be more environmentally sustainable than regularly produced meat. Reactions of vegetarians vary. Rearing a relatively small number of grazing animals can be beneficial, as the Food Climate Research Network at Surrey University reports: "A little bit of livestock production is probably a good thing for the environment".

In May 2009, Ghent, Belgium, was reported to be "the first [city] in the world to go vegetarian at least once a week" for environmental reasons, when local authorities decided to implement a "weekly meatless day". Civil servants would eat vegetarian meals one day per week, in recognition of the United Nations' report. Posters were put up by local authorities to encourage the population to take part on vegetarian days, and "veggie street maps" were printed to highlight vegetarian restaurants. In September 2009, schools in Ghent were due to have a weekly veggiedag ("vegetarian day") too.

Public opinion and acceptance of meat-free food is expected to be more successful if its descriptive words focus less on the health aspects and more on the flavor.

== Labor conditions and diet ==
Some groups, such as PETA, promote vegetarianism as a way to offset poor treatment and working conditions of workers in the contemporary meat industry. These groups cite studies showing the psychological damage caused by working in the meat industry, especially in factory and industrialised settings, and argue that the meat industry violates its labourers' human rights by assigning difficult and distressing tasks without adequate counselling, training and debriefing. However, the working conditions of agricultural workers as a whole, particularly non-permanent workers, remain poor and well below conditions prevailing in other economic sectors. Accidents, including pesticide poisoning, among farmers and plantation workers contribute to increased health risks, including increased mortality. According to the International Labour Organization, agriculture is one of the three most dangerous jobs in the world.

== Economics and diet ==
Some vegetarians are economic vegetarians who avoid meat due to cost considerations. Vegetarians also have an impact on the economy. In 2022, sales of vegetarian food in the UK was estimated at £1.16 billion. The US-based Plant Based Food Association found that the sales of plant-based foods in the U.S. alone amounts to $13.7 billion a year. Vegans have been found to influence the business at restaurants through what is referred to as the vegan veto vote. After rapid growth in the late 2010s, US retail sales of plant-based meat declined from their 2021 peak, even as overall plant-based food sales remained far above pre-2018 levels. Gallup polling similarly found that the increased availability of plant-based products was not accompanied by any rise in the share of Americans identifying as vegetarian or vegan.

=== Economic vegetarianism ===
Similar to environmental vegetarianism is the concept of economic vegetarianism. An economic vegetarian is someone who practices vegetarianism from either the philosophical viewpoint concerning issues such as public health and curbing world starvation, the belief that the consumption of meat is economically unsound, part of a conscious simple living strategy or just out of necessity. According to the Worldwatch Institute, "Massive reductions in meat consumption in industrial nations will ease their health care burden while improving public health; declining livestock herds will take pressure off rangelands and grainlands, allowing the agricultural resource base to rejuvenate. As populations grow, lowering meat consumption worldwide will allow more efficient use of declining per capita land and water resources, while at the same time making grain more affordable to the world's chronically hungry." According to estimates in 2016, adoption of vegetarianism would contribute substantially to global healthcare and environmental savings.

== Demographics ==
In the United States, a 2023 Gallup poll found that 4% of adults identified as vegetarian and 1% as vegan, little changed from 2012 and 2018 but slightly lower than the 6% who identified as vegetarian in 1999 and 2001. Prejudice researcher Gordon Hodson argues that vegetarians and vegans frequently face discrimination where eating meat is held as a cultural norm.

=== Turnover ===
Research suggests that, at least in the United States, vegetarianism has a high turnover rate, with less than 20% of adopters persisting for more than a year. Research shows that lacking social support contributes to lapses. A 2019 analysis found that adhering to any kind of restricted diet (gluten-free, vegetarian, kosher, teetotal) was associated with feelings of loneliness and increased social isolation.

Vegetarians or vegans who adopted their diet abruptly might be more likely to eventually abandon it when compared to individuals adopting their diet gradually with incremental changes.

=== Country-specific information ===
The rate of vegetarianism by country varies substantially from relatively low levels in countries such as the Netherlands (5%) to more considerable levels in India (20–40%). Estimates for the number of vegetarians per country can be subject to methodological difficulties, as respondents may identify as vegetarian even if they include some meat in their diet, and thus some researchers suggest the percentage of vegetarians may be significantly overestimated.

== Media ==
Vegetarianism is occasionally depicted in mass media. Some scholars have argued that mass media serves as a "source of information for individuals" interested in vegetarianism or veganism, while there are "increasing social sanctions against eating meat". Over time, societal attitudes of vegetarianism have changed, as have perceptions of vegetarianism in popular culture, leading to more "vegetarian sentiment". Even so, there are still existing "meat-based" food metaphors which infuse daily speech, and those who are vegetarian and vegan are met with "acceptance, tolerance, or hostility" after they divulge they are vegetarian or vegan. Some writers, such as John L. Cunningham, editor of the Vegetarian Resource Group's newsletter, have argued for "more sympathetic vegetarian characters in the mass media".

=== Literature ===
In Western literature, vegetarianism, and topics that relate to it, have informed a "gamut of literary genres", whether literary fiction or those fictions focusing on utopias, dystopias, or apocalypses, with authors shaped by questions about human identity and "our relation to the environment", implicating vegetarianism and veganism. Others have pointed to the lack of "memorable characters" who are vegetarian. There are also vegetarian themes in horror fiction, science fiction and poetry.

In 1818, Mary Shelley published the novel Frankenstein. Writer and animal rights advocate Carol J. Adams argued in her seminal book, The Sexual Politics of Meat that the unnamed creature in the novel was a vegetarian. She argued that the book was "indebted to the vegetarian climate" of its day and that vegetarianism is a major theme in the novel as a whole. She notes that the creature gives an "emotional speech" talking about its dietary principles, which makes it a "more sympathetic being" than others. She also said that it connected with Vegetarianism in the Romantic Era who believed that the Garden of Eden was meatless, rewrote the myth of Prometheus, the ideas of Jean-Jacques Rousseau, and feminist symbolism. Adams concludes that it is more likely that the "vegetarian revelations" in the novel are "silenced" due to the lack of a "framework into which we can assimilate them." Apart from Adams, scholar Suzanne Samples pointed to "gendered spaces of eating and consumption" within Victorian England which influenced literary characters of the time. This included works such as Alfred, Lord Tennyson's poem titled The Charge of the Light Brigade, Christina Rossetti's volume of poetry titled Goblin Market and Other Poems, Lewis Carroll's Alice's Adventures in Wonderland, Mary Seacole's autographical account titled Wonderful Adventures of Mrs. Seacole in Many Lands, and Anthony Trollope's novel titled Orley Farm. Samples also argued that vegetarianism in the Victorian era "presented a unique lifestyle choice that avoided meat but promoted an awareness of health", which initially was seen as rebellious but later became more normalized.

In Irene Clyde's 1909 feminist utopian novel, Beatrice the Sixteenth, Mary Hatherley accidentally travels through time, discovering a lost world, which is a postgender society named Armeria, with the inhabitants following a strict vegetarian diet, having ceased to slaughter animals for over a thousand years. Some reviewers of the book praised the vegetarianism of the Armerians.

James Joyce's 1922 novel, Ulysses is said to have vegetarian themes. Scholar Peter Adkins argued that while Joyce was critical of the vegetarianism of George A.E. Russell, the novel engages with "questions of animal ethics through its portrayal of Ireland's cattle industry, animal slaughter and the cultural currency of meat," unlike some of his other novels. He also stated that the novel "historicizes and theorizes animal life and death," and that it demonstrates the ways that symbolism and materiality of meat are "co-opted within patriarchal political structures," putting it in the same space as theorists like Carol J. Adams, Donna J. Haraway, Laura Wright, and Cary Wolfe, and writers such as J. M. Coetzee.

In 1997, S. Reneé Wheeler wrote in the Vegetarian Journal, saying that "finding books with vegetarian themes" is important for helping children "feel legitimate in being vegetarian." In 2004, writer J. M. Coetzee argued that since the "mode of consciousness of nonhuman species is quite different from human consciousness," it is hard for writers to realize this for animals, with a "temptation to project upon them feelings and thoughts that may belong only to our own human mind and heart," and stated that reviewers have ignored the presence of animals in his books. He also stated that animals are present in his "fiction either not at all or in a merely subsidiary role" because they occupy "a subsidiary place in our lives" and argued that it is not "possible to write about the inner lives of animals in any complex way."

In 2014, The New Yorker published a short story by Jonathan Lethem titled "Pending Vegan" which follows "one family, a husband and wife and their four-year-old twin daughters" on a trip to SeaWorld in San Diego, California. The protagonist of the story, Paul Espeseth, renames himself "Pending Vegan" in order to acknowledge his "increasing uneasiness with the relationship between man and beast."

In 2016, a three-part Korean novel by Han Kang titled The Vegetarian was published in the U.S., (Note: It was published in 2015 in the U.K. and in South Korea in 2007) which focuses on a woman named Young-hye, who "sees vegetarianism as a way of not inflicting harm on anything," with eating meat symbolizing human violence itself, and later identifies as a plant rather than as a human "and stops eating entirely." Some argued the book was more about mental illness than vegetarianism. Others compared it to fictional works by Margaret Atwood.

=== Television ===
Vegetarians, and vegetarian themes, have appeared in various TV shows, such as Buffy the Vampire Slayer, True Blood, The Simpsons, King of the Hill, and South Park.

Mr. Spock of Star Trek has been called "television's first vegetarian." He and his fellow Vulcans do not eat meat due to a "philosophy of non-violence." He is identified as vegetarian following an episode where he was "transported back to pre-civilised times" and ate meat, and in Richard Marranca, in an issue of the Vegetarian Journal, said that for Spock, like Kwai Chang Caine in Kung Fu, "vegetarianism was something authentic and taken for granted; it was the right thing to do based on compassion and logic."

In 1995, The Simpsons episode "Lisa the Vegetarian" aired. Before recording their lines for the episode, showrunner David Mirkin, who had recently stopped consuming meat, gave Linda and Paul McCartney "a container of his favorite turkey substitute," with both voicing characters in an episode which focused around vegetarianism. Critic Alan Siegel said that before the episode vegetarians had been portrayed as "rarely as anything but one-dimensional hippies" but that this episode was different as it was "told from the point of view of the person becoming a vegetarian." He said that the episode was one of the "first times on television that vegetarians saw an honest depiction of themselves" and of people's reaction to their dietary choices. The idea for the episode was originally proposed by David X. Cohen and the McCartneys agreed on the condition that Lisa remain a vegetarian, with both satisfied with how the episode turned out. In the episode, Lisa decides to stop eating meat after bonding with a lamb at a petting zoo. Her schoolmates and family members ridicule her for her beliefs, but with the help of Apu as well as Paul and Linda McCartney, she commits to vegetarianism. The staff promised that she would remain a vegetarian, resulting in one of the few permanent character changes made in the show. In an August 2020 interview, McCartney said that he and his wife were worried that Lisa "would be a vegetarian for a week, then Homer would persuade her to eat a hot dog," but were assured by the producers that she would remain that way, and he was delighted that they "kept their word."

In September 1998, the King of the Hill episode "And They Call It Bobby Love" aired on FOX. In the episode, "Bobby has a relationship with a vegetarian named Marie. She later dumps him after he eats a steak in front of her." In the March 2002 South Park episode "Fun with Veal", Stan Marsh becomes a vegetarian after he learns that veal is made of baby cows, which Cartman makes fun of. The episode ends with the boys, including Stan, getting grounded, but not before going out with their parents for burgers, meaning that Stan is no longer a vegetarian. In the DVD commentary, the creators said they wanted to balance their message of not eating baby animals, by at the same time not advocating people abstain from meat consumption altogether.

Aang, in the animated series Avatar: The Last Airbender and The Legend of Korra was vegetarian. According to the show's creators, "Buddhism and Taoism have been huge inspirations behind the idea for Avatar." As shown in "The King of Omashu" and "The Headband", a notable aspect of Aang's character is his vegetarian diet, which is consistent with Buddhism, Hinduism, and Taoism. In the Brahmajala Sutra, a Buddhist code of ethics, vegetarianism is encouraged.

Other fictional characters who are vegetarians include Count Duckula in Count Duckula, Beast Boy in Teen Titans and Teen Titans Go!, Lenore in Supernatural, and Norville "Shaggy" Rogers in the animated series What's New, Scooby Doo?. Before the latter animated series, Shaggy was known for having an "enormous appetite" earlier in the Scooby-Doo franchise. The decision to make Shaggy a vegetarian occurred after his voice actor, Casey Kasem, convinced the producers to do so, since he was a vegan who supported animal rights and opposed factory farming, saying he would refuse to voice Shaggy unless the character was vegetarian.

An October 2019 South Park episode, "Let Them Eat Goo", featured a vegetarian character. Additionally, Steven Universe, the protagonist in the show Steven Universe and the limited epilogue series, Steven Universe Future, is a vegetarian. In the episode "Snow Day" of Steven Universe Future, Steven tells the Gems he lives with that he has been a vegetarian for a month, drinks protein shakes and mentions that he does "his own skincare routine."

=== Film ===
In the 1999 film, Notting Hill, Keziah, played by Emma Bernard is a vegetarian. In one scene, Keziah tells William "Will" Thacker (played by Hugh Grant), that she is a fruitarian.

In the 2000 film, But I'm A Cheerleader, before Megan, one of the film's protagonists, is sent to a conversion therapy camp, her parents and others claim she is a lesbian because she is a vegetarian. Legally Blonde, a 2001 film, also featured a vegetarian—Elle Woods. When she introduces herself at Harvard Law School, she describes herself and her dog as "Gemini vegetarians".

In the 2012 film, Life of Pi, Pi, played by Suraj Sharma, is a vegetarian based on his 3 religions: Hindu, Christian, and Muslim. And in the ship scene, one Taiwanese Sailor, played by Bo-Chieh Wang, is a vegetarian from his Buddhism religion to eat rice and the vegetarian gravy.

In the 2018 Hollywood blockbuster, Black Panther, M'Baku (voiced by Winston Duke), the Jabari tribe leader who lives in the mountains of Wakanda, declares to a White CIA agent named Everett Ross (voiced by Martin Freeman), "if you say one more word, I'll feed you to my children!" After Everett is shaken by these words, he jokes, saying he is kidding because all those in his tribe, including himself, are vegetarians. Some praised this scene for challenging a stereotype of Black culture and the perception of what vegetarians look like. Duke later said that some Black outlets cooked vegan meals for him, and said that the scene is "kind of teaching kids that eating vegetables is cool," which is something he is for.

Vegetarian themes have also been noted in the Twilight novel (2005–2008) and film franchise (2008–2012), The Road (2006) and The Year of the Flood (2009). In March 2020, scholar Nathan Poirer reviewed Thinking Veganism in Literature and Culture: Towards a Vegan Theory, a book edited by Emelia Quinn and Benjamin Westwood, and he concluded that veganism could "infiltrate popular culture without being perceived as threatening," while noting others who contribute to the book examining vegan cinema that "challenges the normality of human supremacy by situating humans as potential prey," and stating that the essays outline ways veganism can be successful in popular culture.

Reviewers said that the Netflix original film, Okja, which focused on factory farming, talks about genetically modified animals, and features a radical environmentalist group, had an impact on people's diets. Some said the film would convince audience members to become vegetarians, saying the film encourages people to eat less meat, comparing it to the impact of the documentaries Food, Inc., Blackfish, The Cove, and Cowspiracy, Jonathan Safran Foer's book, Eating Animals, the films Charlotte's Web, Babe, and Chicken Run, and to the themes of Watership Down. The film was also described as the "ultimate vegetarian film." The film's co-writer, Jon Ronson, who is also vegetarian, said that while the film will "turn people vegetarian", this was not his intention nor that of director Bong Joon-ho. In an interview with The Independent, Joon-ho said that he did not "expect the entire audience to convert to veganism after watching the film" and said that he does not have an issue with meat consumption, but asked the audience to consider where their food comes from, and said if that happens, then the "level of meat consumption will gradually decline." Joon-Ho told LA Times that in his view, the food industry is "always trying to do is try to thicken the walls of the slaughterhouse so that nobody can peer inside it," with LA Times noting that Joon-Ho became vegan after visiting a slaughterhouse in South Korea, but ended the diet change after two months. Paul Dano, who plays Jay in the film, also told GQ that, while he is a meat-eater, it made him want to "be more conscientious consumer" and said it is easy to "forget that when we put our dollar down we are supporting something."

Other scholars noted vegetarian themes in the films The Fault in Our Stars, The Princess Diaries series, and the 2009 film, Vegetarian.

== See also ==
- Bibliography of veganism and vegetarianism
- European Vegetarian Union
- International Vegetarian Union
- List of vegetarians
- Plant-based diet
- ProVeg International
- Vegetarian and vegan symbolism
- Vegetarian cuisine
- Vegetarian Diet Pyramid
- Vegetarian nutrition
- Women and vegetarianism and veganism advocacy
