= St Clair-Ford baronets =

Title in the Baronetage of Great Britain

Escutcheon of the St Clair-Ford baronets of Ember Court

The Ford, later St Clair-Ford baronetcy, of Ember Court in the County of Surrey, is a title in the Baronetage of Great Britain. It was created on 22 February 1793 for Francis Ford, a planter in Barbados. He was a member of the Council of Barbados, and Member of Parliament for Newcastle-under-Lyme.

The 6th Baronet was a captain in the Royal Navy, who was awarded a DSO and Bar in command of HMS Kipling in World War II.

== Ford, later St Clair-Ford baronets, of Ember Court (1793) ==
- Sir Francis Ford, 1st Baronet (1758–1801), father of Sophia Chichester and Georgiana Welch.
- Sir Francis Ford, 2nd Baronet (1787–1839)
- Sir Francis John Ford, 3rd Baronet (1818–1850), adoptive father of Francina Sorabji.
- Sir Francis Colville Ford, 4th Baronet (1850–1890)
- Sir (Francis Charles) Rupert Ford, 5th Baronet (1877–1948)
- Sir Aubrey St Clair-Ford, 6th Baronet (1904–1991)
- Sir James Anson St Clair-Ford, 7th Baronet (1952–2009)
- Sir Colin Anson St Clair-Ford, 8th Baronet (1939–2012)
- Sir Robin Sam St Clair-Ford, 9th Baronet (1941–2016)
- Sir (William) Sam St Clair-Ford, 10th Baronet (born 1982)

The heir presumptive is the present holder's brother Peter James St Clair-Ford (born 1984).

== Extended family ==
Captain St Clair Ford (1830–1896), third son of the 2nd Baronet and grandfather of the 6th Baronet, assumed the additional surname of St Clair in 1878, becoming St Clair St Clair-Ford.

Baronetage of Great Britain
Preceded by Tollemache baronets	Ford baronets of Ember Court; 22 February 1793	Succeeded by Smith-Burges baronets
