= John Smith-Burges =

Chairman of the East India Company in 1791

Lt. Col. Sir John Smith-Burges, 1st Baronet (c. 1734 – 24 April 1803) was Chairman of the East India Company in 1791.

== Life ==
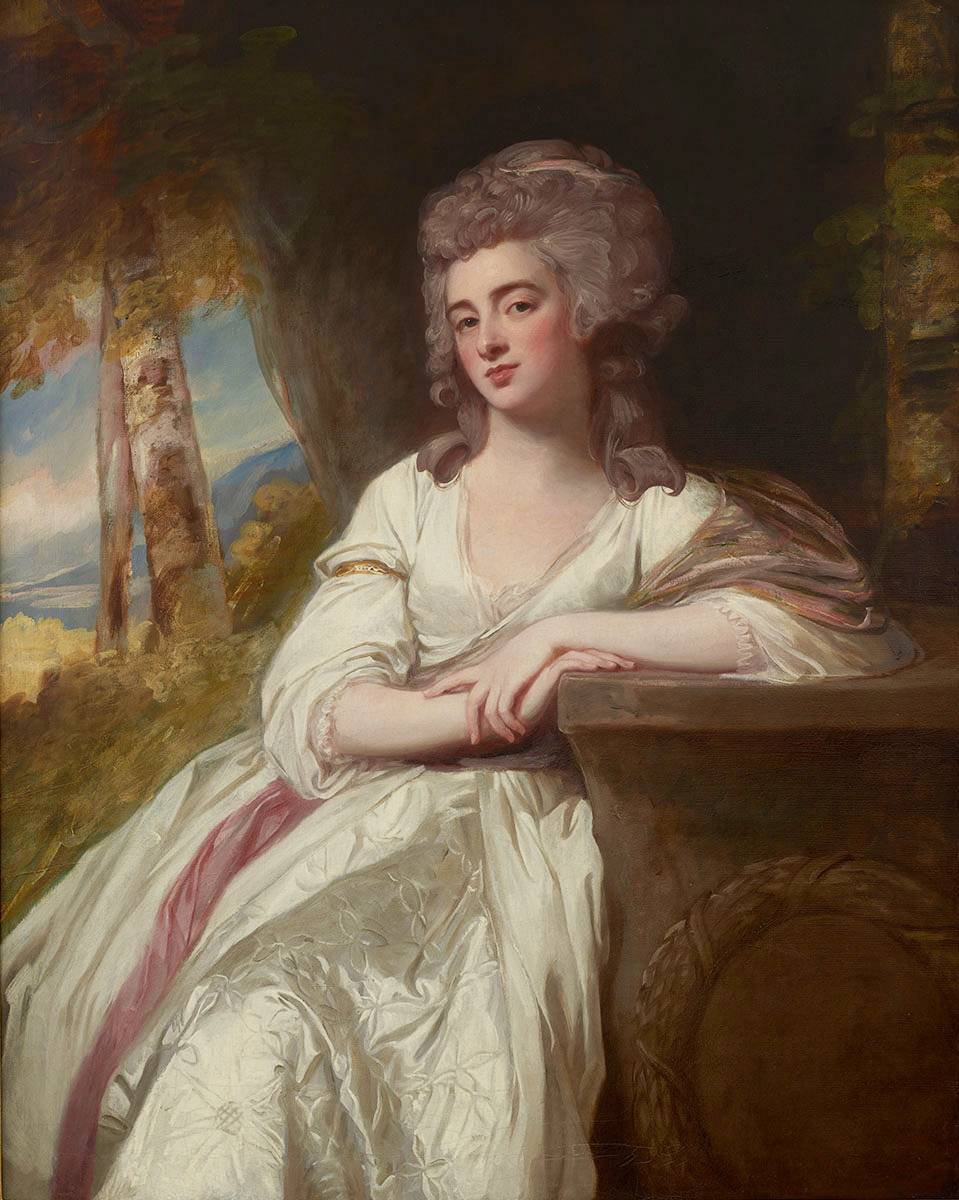
Margaret Smith, portrait by George Romney

Smith-Burges was a director of the East India Company. He was Lieutenant-Colonel in the service of the 3rd Regiment, East India Volunteers.

He was the son of John Smith and Mary Ransom. He was born John Smith and changed his name by Royal Licence on 10 June 1790 to John Smith-Burges. He was created 1st Baronet Smith-Burges, of East Ham, in the county of Essex, on 4 May 1793.

== Family ==
John Smith married Margaret Burges, daughter of Ynyr Burges and Margaret Brown, on 14 May 1771. The couple lived at the Bower House, Havering atte Bower. His father-in-law, Ynyr Burges, was Secretary of the East India Company; he had been offered the baronetcy, and turned it down.

Sir John Smith-Burges left no male heir and the title became extinct on his death.

Margaret married, secondly in 1816, John Poulett, 4th Earl Poulett, as his second wife.

Baronetage of Great Britain
Preceded by Ford baronets	Smith-Burges baronets of East Ham; 4 May 1793	Succeeded by Baring baronets
