= James Pierrepont Greaves =

English mystic and educational reformer (1777–1842)

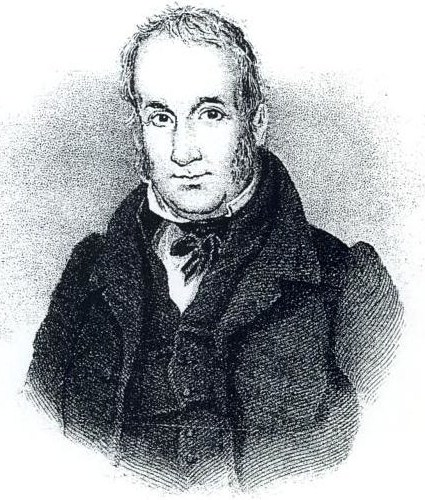
- Engraved portrait of Greaves
- Born: 1 February 1777; Merton, Surrey, England
- Died: 11 March 1842 (aged 65); Alcott House, Ham, Surrey, England
- Occupations: Mystic; educational reformer; socialist

James Pierrepont Greaves (1 February 1777 – 11 March 1842) was an English mystic, educational reformer, and socialist. He founded Alcott House, a utopian community and school at Ham, Surrey. Greaves described himself as a "sacred socialist" and advocated vegetarianism, temperance, hydrotherapy, and other health practices.

== Life and work ==
James Pierrepont Greaves was born in Merton, Surrey, on 1 February 1777, the son of Charles Greaves, a draper, and Ann Pierrepont. He worked as a merchant and draper in London. One account states that the firm in which he was a partner became bankrupt in 1806 after the Milan and Berlin decrees restricted trade between Britain and continental Europe. Another source states that, "after getting rich in commerce he lost his fortune by imprudent speculations". Greaves surrendered his property to his creditors and lived for a time on the income allowed to him while he wound up the affairs of his establishment. He later rebuilt his business.

In 1817, Greaves experienced what he called "some strong interior visitations". These led him to a belief in the "divine in man" and to the view that he had a spiritual mission to share his commitment to the love of God. In 1818, he joined Johann Heinrich Pestalozzi, the Swiss educational reformer, at Yverdon, where he taught English. While there he met Robert Owen.

Greaves returned to England in 1825. He founded the London Infant School Society and became its secretary. In 1832, he lived in Randwick, Gloucestershire, where he and his sister Mary Ann Greaves took part in an industrial scheme for agricultural labourers. From the 1830s onwards he referred to himself as a "sacred socialist".

After returning to London, Greaves formed a circle of associates. In 1836, he founded a philosophical society known as the Aesthetic Society, which met for a time at a house in Burton Street, Camden. His educational work was connected with his religious and philosophical views. He wrote: "As Being is before knowing and doing, I affirm that education can never repair the defects of Birth". He therefore argued for "the divine existence being developed and associated with man and woman prior to marriage". Greaves was a follower of Jakob Böhme and was influenced by German transcendentalism, Thomas Taylor, William Law, and neoplatonism.

Greaves worked with Charles and Elizabeth Mayo to found the Home and Colonial School Society in Gray's Inn Road in 1836. The institution was based on Pestalozzi's educational ideas, including opposition to rote learning, and included a model infant school.

Greaves and his followers founded Alcott House in Ham, Surrey (now in the London Borough of Richmond upon Thames, Greater London). It was a utopian religious community and school which operated from 1838 to 1848. It was named after Amos Bronson Alcott, the American transcendentalist, with whom Greaves corresponded. Alcott visited the community in 1842.

The religious writer Francis Foster Barham (1808–1871), a member of Greaves's Aesthetic Society, regarded him as superior to Coleridge in spiritual attainment. Barham wrote that Greaves's acquaintances saw him as "a moral phenomenon, as a unique specimen of human character, as a study, as a curiosity, and an absolute undefinable". Another acquaintance, whom Greaves often visited, observed that Greaves was frequently in financial distress and did not give much weight to conventional ways of earning a living.

Greaves did not publish any books during his lifetime, though some of his writings appeared in periodicals. He spent his last years at Alcott House and died there on 11 March 1842, aged 65. Two volumes of his writings were published after his death. Some minor posthumous publications appeared in the British Museum catalogue.

== Vegetarianism ==
Greaves advocated vegetarianism, hydrotherapy, drinking water, and celibacy. He opposed the consumption of alcohol and meat, and recommended daily cold showers and bathing in spring water. His recommended diet consisted of uncooked fruit, nuts, and vegetables.

== Bibliography ==
Biography:

- Charles Lane. James Pierrepont Greaves (J. Munroe, 1842).
- J. E. M. Latham. Search for a New Eden: James Pierrepont Greaves (1777–1842) (Associated University Presses, 1999).

Other books:

- Pestalozzi, J. H. Letters on Early Education. Addressed to J. P. Greaves, Esq. (London: Sherwood, Gilbert and Piper, 1827).
- F. B. Sanborn. Bronson Alcott at Alcott House, England, and Fruitlands, New England (1842–1844) (The Torch Press, 1908).
- R. C. S. Trahair. Utopias and Utopians: An Historical Dictionary (Greenwood Press, 1999), pp. 161–162.

Articles:

- James Pierrepoint Greaves (The Dial, volume 3, 1843, Weeks, Jordan, and Co.), pp. 247–255, 281–296.
- The New Age, and Concordium Gazette (W. Strange, 1845), the journal of the Ham Common Concordium.
- Julia Twigg. The Vegetarian Movement in England, 1847–1981: A Study in the Structure of its Ideology (LSE doctoral thesis, 1981).
