= Alcott House =

British community and school (1838–1848)

Coordinates: 51.436457°N 0.305813°W

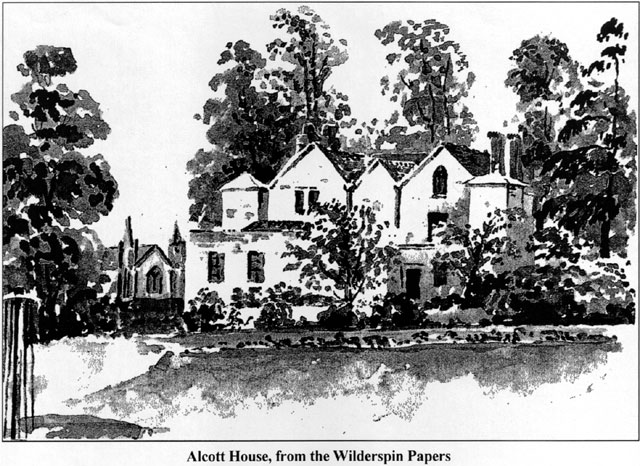
Alcott House from the Wilderspin papers

Alcott House in Ham, Surrey (now in the London Borough of Richmond upon Thames), was the home of a utopian spiritual community and progressive school which lasted from 1838 to 1848. Supporters of Alcott House, or the Concordium, were a key group involved in the formation of the Vegetarian Society in 1847.

== History and ideology ==
The prime mover behind the community was "sacred socialist" and mystic James Pierrepont Greaves, who was influenced by American transcendentalist Amos Bronson Alcott, and Swiss educational reformer Johann Heinrich Pestalozzi. Together with his followers, who included Charles Lane – and with the help of wealthy sponsors, Sophia and Georgiana Chichester – he founded Alcott House on Ham Common in Surrey in 1838. The Ham Common Concordium, as it came to be known, consisted of a working mixed cooperative community and a progressive school for children. The headmaster of Alcott House was Henry Gardiner Wright.

The community was dedicated to a regime of spiritual development and purification – in the words of Greaves, aiming to produce the "most loveful, intelligent and efficient conditions for divine progress in humanity". To this end the members submitted to an austere regime of early rising, strict vegetarianism (usually raw food), no stimulants, celibacy, and simple living, and experimented with various practices such as astrology, hydrotherapy, mesmerism and phrenology. The men grew their hair and beards long and wore loose-fitting clothes, while the women defied convention by not wearing the traditional, restrictive corset.

The community at Alcott House promoted a strict vegan diet, all meals were served cold apart from hot potatoes. Alcott House rejected all animal source foods including meat, butter, cheese, eggs and all stimulants such as chocolate, coffee, tea as well as mustard, salt, vinegar and spices.

Alcott House school was open to children from both inside and outside the community – the latter usually from radical parents who sympathised with its progressive educational stance. The curriculum emphasised moral education and the development of the child's innate spiritual gifts, teaching practical skills such as gardening and cookery as well as book learning. Punishment was frowned upon and education aimed to produce "integral men and women", able to live in a truly cooperative society and not simply playing traditional roles.

In 1848, the community came to an end and the house was purchased in 1849 by John Minter Morgan to provide an orphanage for 70 children, the National Orphan Home for Girls, though still run along vegetarian lines.

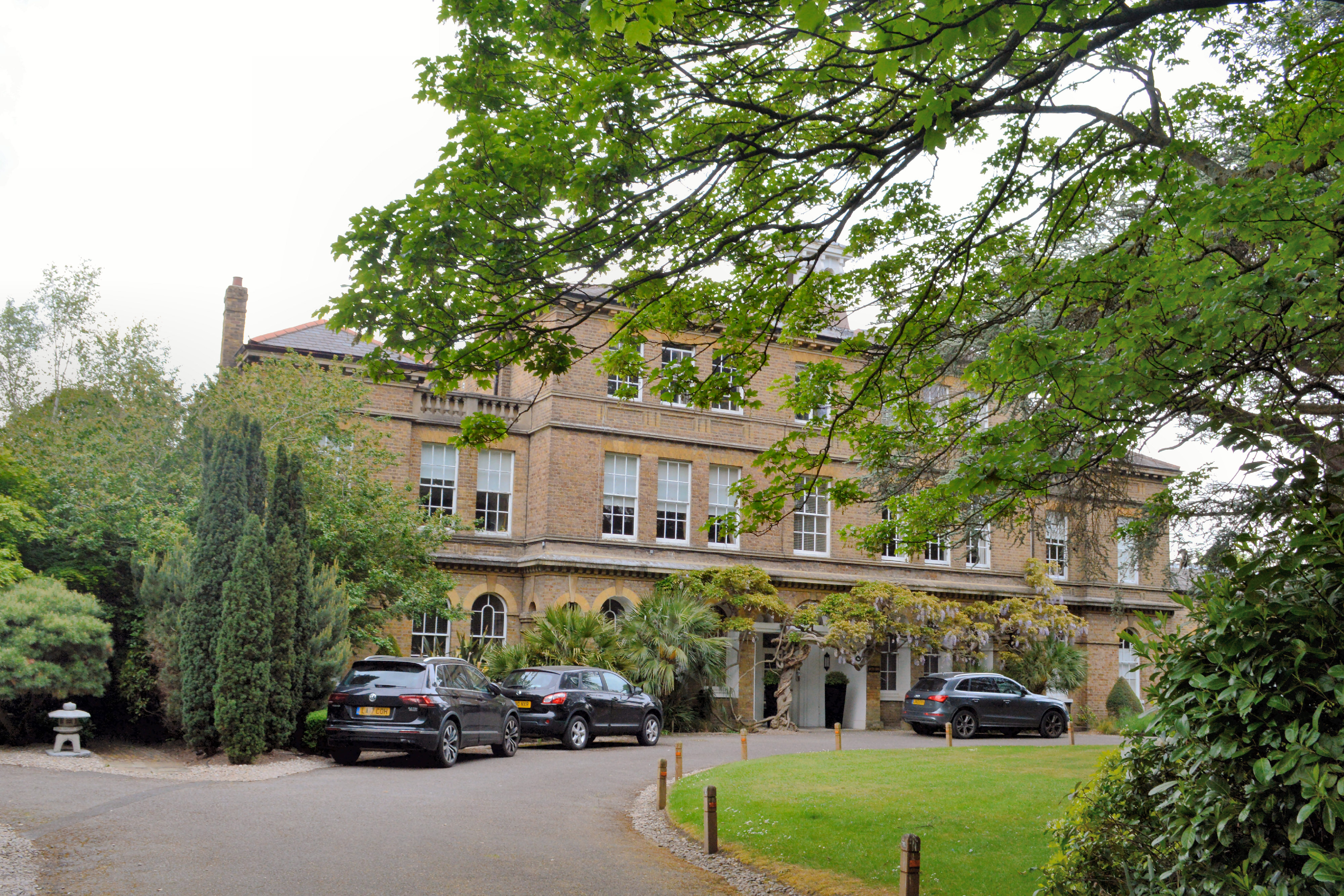
South Lodge

In 1856 the foundation stone was laid for the present building, South Lodge, opened in 1862, which could accommodate 200 children in the National Orphan Home for Girls. It is of "yellow brick, Late Classical, with a central turret in the Italiane style". The orphanage closed in 1924. South Lodge has been converted to flats and the grounds have been developed as Bishops Close.

== British and Foreign Society for the Promotion of Humanity and Abstinence from Animal Food ==
The British and Foreign Society for the Promotion of Humanity and Abstinence from Animal Food was formed at Alcott House by a group of vegetarians in 1843. Unlike other organisations during this time, the Society had an open membership for women and let them hold office. The Society has been described as the world's first vegetarian organisation, and as a forerunner to the Vegetarian Society. Its president was Sophia Chichester.

== See also ==
- Fruitlands
- Vegetarianism in the Victorian era

== Sources ==
- The New Age, and Concordium Gazette (pub. W. Strange, 1845), the journal of the Ham Common Concordium
