= Jain vegetarianism =

Set of religion-based dietary rules

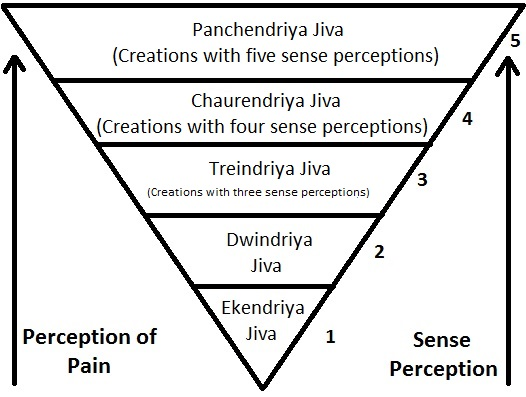
The food choices of Jains are based on the value of Ahimsa (non-violence), which means Jains prefer food that inflicts the least amount of violence.

Jain vegetarianism is the mandatory, spiritually motivated diet practiced by the followers of Jainism. Rooted in the foundational principle of ahimsa (nonviolence), it is considered one of the most rigorous dietary frameworks on the Indian subcontinent. The diet strictly prohibits the consumption of meat, fish, eggs, alcoholic beverages, and honey. Furthermore, guided by a complex biological taxonomy of senses, it restricts the consumption of root and underground vegetables—such as potatoes, onions, garlic, and lotus stem—to prevent the destruction of microscopic lifeforms (nigoda) and to avoid uprooting entire plants. To further prevent the accidental ingestion of insects and mobile microorganisms (trasa jiva), the diet additionally forbids fungi (mushrooms), multi-seeded vegetables like brinjal (eggplant), and plants with tightly packed floral or leafy structures that harbor insects, such as cauliflower, broccoli, and cabbage. The traditional dietary baseline is strictly lacto-vegetarian, with dairy products like milk, curd, and ghee holding significant culinary and ritual importance; however, a minority of contemporary practitioners have begun adopting vegan alternatives in response to the mechanized violence of modern commercial dairy farming.

The theological objective of the diet is to prevent the accumulation of harmful karma, which Jain philosophy defines as a physical substance that binds to the soul and prevents spiritual liberation (moksha). Jain dietary law emphasizes not only the physical act of non-violence (dravya-himsa) but also the absolute necessity of psychological purity and intent (bhava-himsa). Consequently, practices such as Chauvihar (fasting after sunset), strict water filtration, and the temporal management of fermented foods are rigorously implemented to minimize accidental harm to microorganisms. The extent of these practices varies between the strict Great Vows (Mahavratas) of ascetics and the practical Lesser Vows (Anuvratas) of the laity.

Historically, the codification of the Jain diet by prominent monastic scholars significantly influenced Indian statecraft, leading to imperial edicts restricting animal slaughter under dynasties such as the Chaulukyas and the Mughal Empire. Beyond personal food consumption, the ethical principles of the diet extend into a comprehensive socio-economic lifestyle. Traditional Jain legal codes prohibit participation in the 15 forbidden trades (karmadanas), establishing early systems of ethical capital allocation and explicitly banning the use of animal-derived apparel such as leather and traditional silk.

This rigorous adherence to nonviolence has profoundly shaped the broader culinary landscape of India. The restrictions on foundational flavor bases like onions and root vegetables drove significant regional culinary innovation, particularly in Gujarat and Rajasthan. Today, the demand for strict adherence to these dietary boundaries has resulted in the standardization of "Jain food" as a formally recognized catering category across major airlines, railway networks, and international hospitality chains.

== History and origins ==
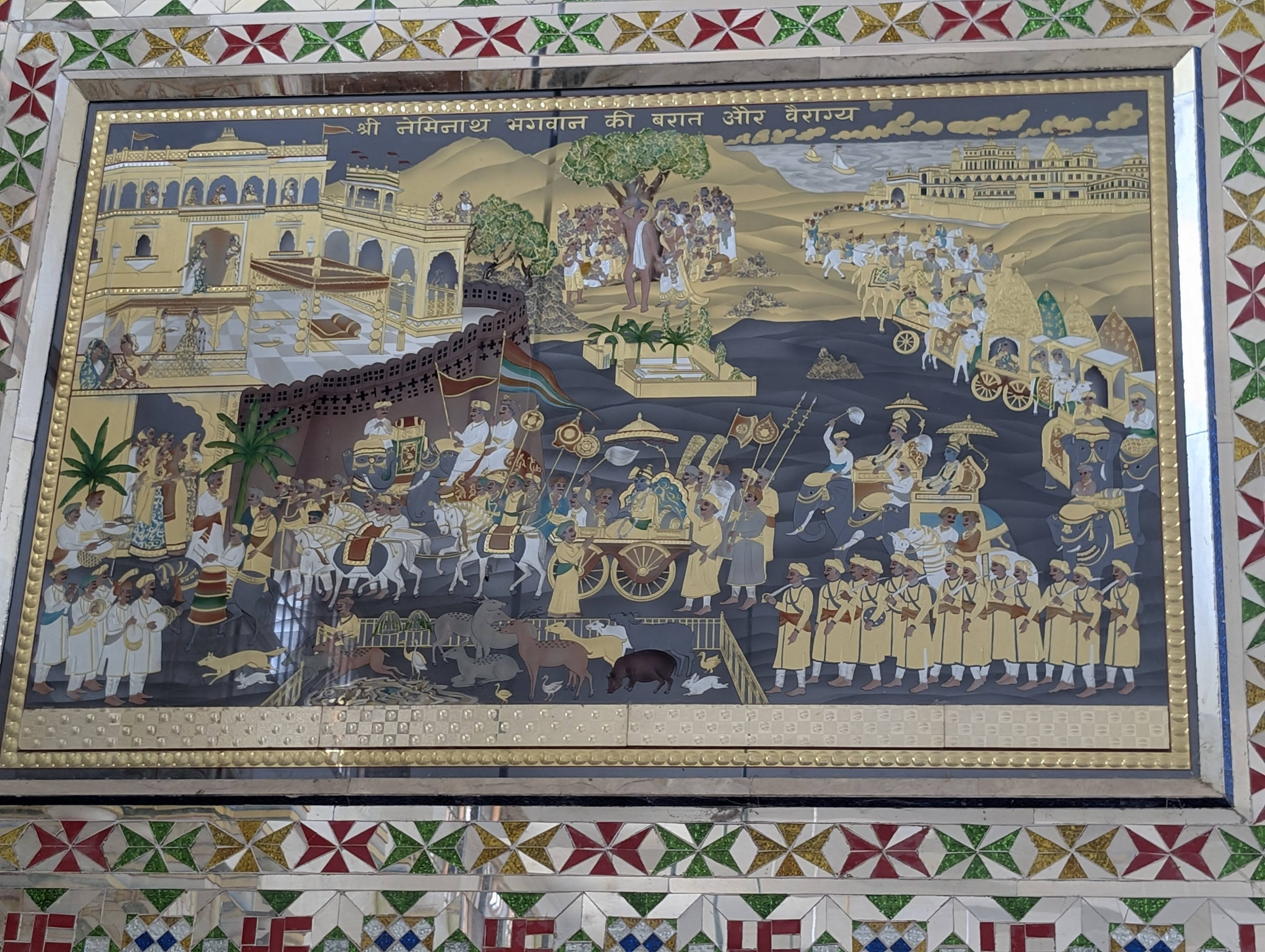
Wedding procession of Neminatha, 22nd Jain tirthankara and his renunciation seeing pain of animals kept for slaughter. Painting in Ranila Jain temple, Haryana

The historical codification of Jain vegetarianism as a universal mandate for the lay community is sociologically anchored in the narrative of Neminatha, the 22nd tirthankara. According to Jain tradition, Prince Neminatha abandoned his royal wedding in Junagadh upon hearing the cries of captive animals slated to be slaughtered for the wedding feast. His renunciation is said to be followed by his meditation at Mount Girnar. His refusal to predicate personal celebration upon animal slaughter served as a defining cultural catalyst. Scholars identify this event as the foundational charter myth that shifted vegetarianism from an isolated ascetic exercise in self-denial into a universal ethical baseline regarding animal welfare for the entire Jain community.

When Mahavira revived and reorganized the Jain community in the 6th century BCE, ahimsa was already an established, strictly observed rule. Parshvanatha, a tirthankara whom modern Western historians consider a historical figure, lived in about the 8th century BCE and founded a community to which Mahavira's parents belonged. Parshvanatha's followers vowed to observe ahimsa; this obligation was part of their caujjama dhamma (Fourfold Restraint).

In the times of Mahavira and in the following centuries, Jains criticized Buddhists and followers of the Vedic religion or Hindus for negligence and inconsistency in the implementation of ahimsa. In particular, they strongly objected to the Vedic tradition of animal sacrifice with subsequent meat-eating, and to hunting.

According to the famous Tamil classic, Tirukkuṛaḷ, which is also considered a Jain work by some scholars:

If the world did not purchase and consume meat, no one would slaughter and offer meat for sale. (Kural 256)

Widely considered the most revered figure in the Digambara monastic lineage, Kundakunda (1st century BCE – 1st century CE) provided the philosophical engine for the Jain diet by rigorously establishing the supremacy of bhava-himsa (psychological violence or intent). In texts such as the Samayasāra, he argued that physical nonviolence (dravya-himsa) is meaningless without mental purity. This philosophical stance codified the Jain dietary rule that eating even a plant-based food item with the intent or desire to consume meat constitutes a severe karmic violation.

Samantabhadra authored the Ratnakaranda Śrāvakācāra, the earliest and most authoritative Digambara manual dedicated exclusively to the conduct of laypeople (householders). Prior to his work, the dietary boundaries between strict ascetic fasting and daily lay consumption were fluid. Samantabhadra explicitly codified the absolute avoidance of the three makaras (meat, alcohol, and honey) and the five udumbara (figs) as the non-negotiable, fundamental baseline for anyone claiming Jain identity.

Amritchandra, a 10th-century Jain monk, is the theological architect of the lay Jain diet. He authored the Puruṣārthasiddhyupāya, arguably the most important classical manual on lay ethics. While earlier texts focused heavily on the extreme vows of monks, Amritchandra meticulously codified exactly how householders should eat. He is the author who explicitly laid down the mechanical logic prohibiting the maha-vigai (honey, alcohol, meat) and formulated the psychological argument that intoxication destroys the mindfulness required for ahimsa.

Hemachandra, a 12th-century Jain scholar and monk, achieved a significant political victory for vegetarianism in Indian history. He successfully converted King Kumarapala of the Chaulukya dynasty (who ruled present-day Gujarat and surrounding areas) to Jainism. Under Hemachandra's guidance, King Kumarapala issued sweeping imperial edicts (amari-ghoshana) that legally banned the slaughter of animals across his entire kingdom. This alliance is historically responsible for cementing Gujarat as the geographic epicenter of strict vegetarian cuisine in India.

In the 16th century, the Jain monk Hiravijaya Suri was invited to the court of the Mughal Emperor Akbar. Through philosophical discussions regarding nonviolence, the monk persuaded the Emperor to issue imperial edicts (farmans) that legally enforced animal welfare across the empire. These edicts temporarily banned the slaughter of animals for several months of the year, prohibited fishing in specific sacred lakes, and mandated the release of thousands of caged birds. This represents one of the earliest recorded instances of state-enforced animal welfare and dietary restrictions at the imperial level in Indian history.

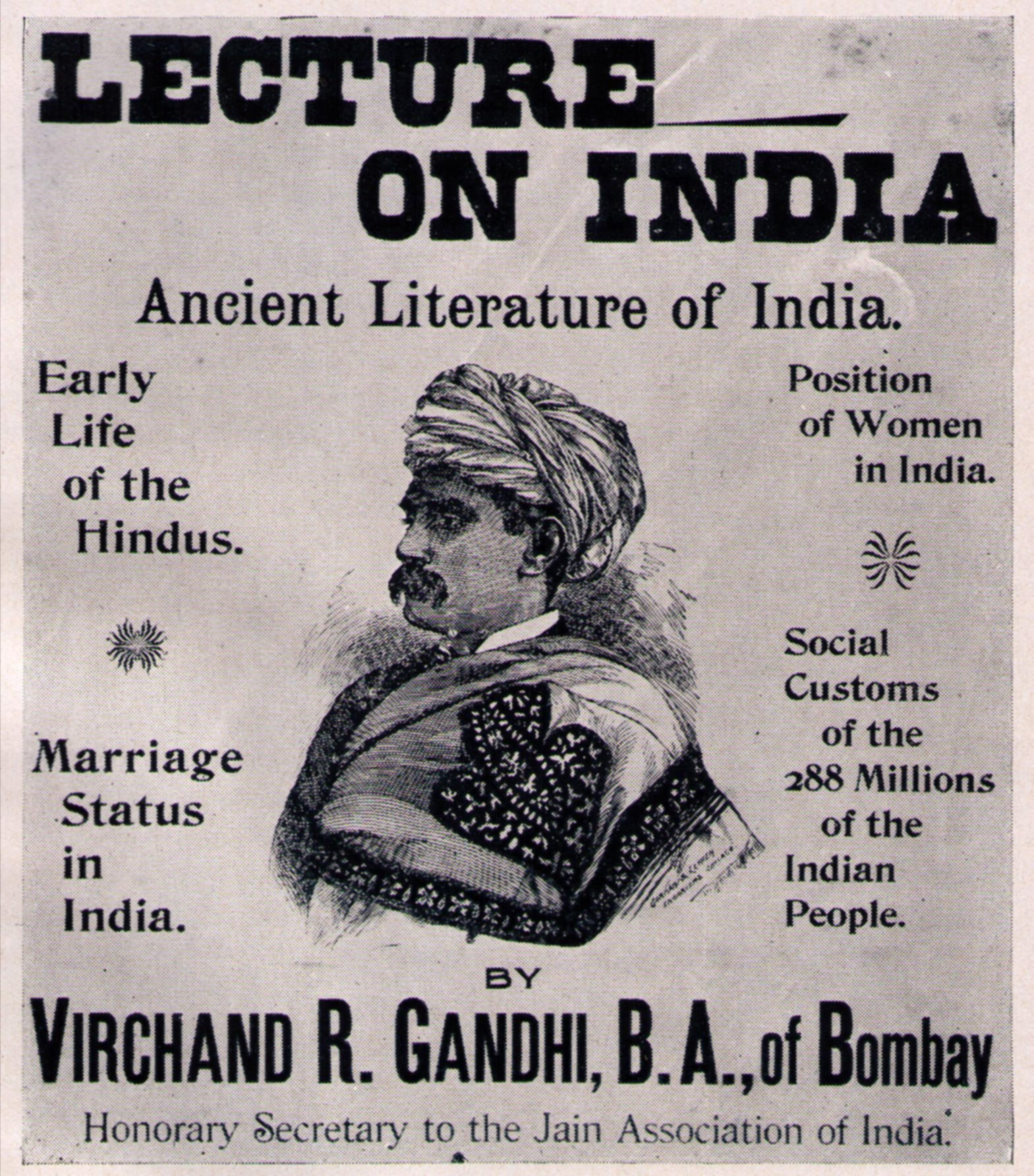
Poster announcing lecture by Virachand Gandhi

Virchand Gandhi was the official delegate representing Jainism at the first World's Parliament of Religions in Chicago in 1893. He was one of the first historical figures to defend Jain vegetarianism on a global stage to a Western audience. Gandhi systematically dismantled the contemporary Western assumption that vegetarianism led to physical weakness, successfully reframing the Jain diet in the West as a highly rational, scientifically grounded, and compassionate lifestyle.

Bringing the Digambara ethical framework into the modern era, Acharya Vidyasagar was a prominent advocate for updating ancient dietary strictures to address contemporary industrial challenges. He actively campaigned against the modern commercialized dairy industry, instructing followers that mechanized milk extraction and the associated cruelty to calves violates ahimsa. Furthermore, he was a primary catalyst behind the modern Digambara adoption of "Ahimsa Silk" (peace silk) and handloom cotton, urging followers to abandon machine-made and animal-derived textiles to maintain dietary and lifestyle purity in an industrialized economy.

Some Brahmins—Kashmiri Pandits and Bengali Brahmins—have traditionally eaten meat (primarily seafood). However, in regions with strong Jain influence such as Rajasthan and Gujarat, or strong Jain influence in the past such as Karnataka and Tamil Nadu, Brahmins are strict vegetarians. Bal Gangadhar Tilak has described Jainism as the originator of ahimsa. He wrote in a letter:

In ancient times, innumerable animals were butchered in sacrifices. Evidence in support of this is found in various poetic compositions such as the Meghaduta. But the credit for the disappearance of this terrible massacre from the Brahminical religion goes to Jainism.

== Biological and theological framework ==
The Jain vegetarian diet is not merely an ethical choice but a mandatory, foundational practice rooted in the religion's core metaphysics. The diet is understood as the primary, daily application of Ahimsa (non-violence), which Jainism holds as the supreme duty (Ahimsa Paramo Dharma). This rigorous discipline is considered essential for the soul's liberation (Moksha).

=== Ahimsa and Karmic matter ===
Unlike many other religions where karma is an abstract principle, Jain philosophy defines karma as a subtle, physical substance (pudgala) that clings to the soul (jiva). According to Jain doctrine, any act of himsa (violence)—in thought, word, or action—causes these material karmic particles to stick to the soul. This karmic bondage (bandha) obscures the soul's innate purity and consciousness, trapping it in the cycle of rebirth (Saṃsāra).

The ultimate goal of Jainism is to stop the influx (āsrava) of new karma and shed the old (nirjarā). Therefore, the scrupulous avoidance of violence, beginning with diet, is seen as a matter of spiritual survival and a non-negotiable prerequisite for liberation.

=== Taxonomy of senses ===
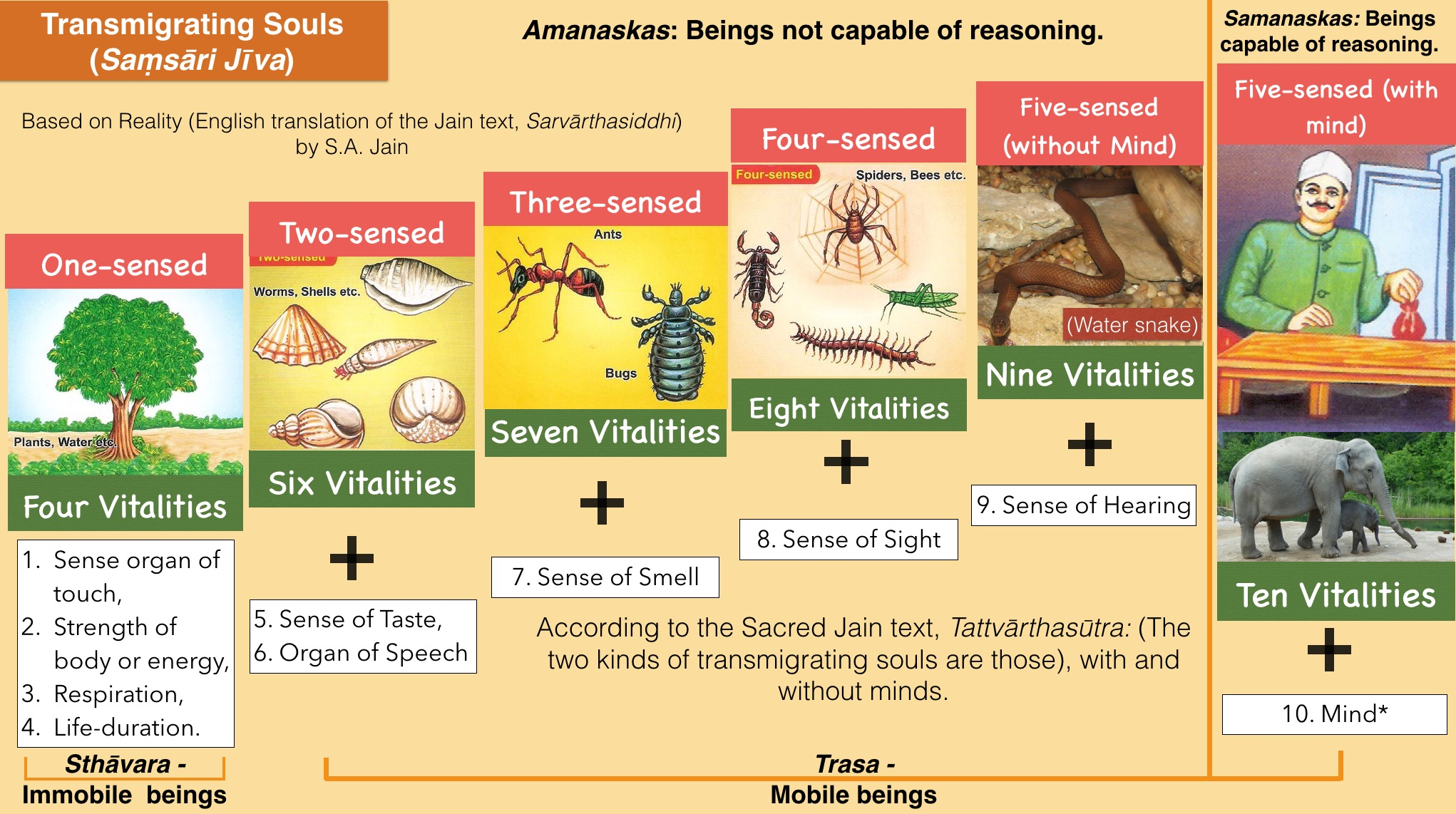
Classification of Saṃsāri Jīvas (Transmigrating Souls) as per Jainism

Jain metaphysics provides a detailed classification of all life-forms (jiva) based on their number of senses (indriya). This hierarchy determines the "karmic: cost" of harming them, with himsa against a higher-sensed being incurring a far greater karmic burden.

- Five-sensed (pancha-indriya): Humans, animals, birds, and fish.
- Four-sensed (chatur-indriya): Insects such as bees, flies, and wasps.
- Three-sensed (tri-indriya): Ants, lice, and fleas.
- Two-sensed (dvi-indriya): Worms, leeches, and shellfish.
- One-sensed (ekendriya): These beings possess only the sense of touch and are further divided into:
  - Plant-bodied (vanaspati-kay)
  - Water-bodied (ap-kay)
  - Fire-bodied (tejas-kay)
  - Air-bodied (vayu-kay)
  - Earth-bodied (prithvi-kay)

The Jain diet is structured to incur the absolute minimum karmic harm by permitting only the consumption of one-sensed, plant-bodied beings, as all other life-forms are explicitly forbidden.

=== The Nigoda Doctrine ===
The rules for plant consumption are further refined by the doctrine of nigoda, which is central to the Jain diet. Nigoda are microscopic, one-sensed souls that are infinite in number and are believed to exist everywhere, especially in soil and root systems. Jain texts distinguish between two types of one-sensed plant beings:

1. Pratyeka-kay (One-bodied plants): These are plants where a single body hosts a single soul. Fruits, vegetables that grow above ground, and legumes are in this category.
2. Anant-kay (Infinite-bodied plants): These are plants where a single body (like a bulb or root) is the host for an infinite number of nigoda souls.

Root vegetables (such as potatoes, onions, garlic, and carrots) are classified as anant-kay. Consuming a single potato is thus believed to cause the himsa of destroying an infinite number of souls, incurring a massive karmic burden. This metaphysical distinction is the primary, doctrinal reason for the strict prohibition of all underground root vegetables.

Jains make considerable efforts not to injure plants in everyday life as far as possible. Jains accept such violence only in as much as it is indispensable for human survival, and there are special instructions for preventing unnecessary violence against plants. Strict Jains do not eat root vegetables, such as potatoes, onions, roots and tubers, as they are considered ananthkay. Ananthkay means one body, but containing infinite lives. A root vegetable, such as potato, though appearing to be a single object, is said to contain infinite lives. Also, tiny life forms are injured when the plant is pulled up and because the bulb is seen as a living being, as it is able to sprout. Also, consumption of most root vegetables involves uprooting and killing the entire plant, whereas consumption of most terrestrial vegetables does not kill the plant (it lives on after plucking the vegetables or it was seasonally supposed to wither away anyway). Among Indian Jains, 67% report that they abstain from eating root vegetables.

== The Ethics of Intent (Bhava-himsa) ==
Within the Jain ethical framework, the prohibition against eating meat extends beyond the physical act of killing (dravya-himsa) to the psychological intent behind it (bhava-himsa). This is academically illustrated through the classical Jain narrative of King Yashodhara and the dough rooster. In this ethical parable, a king compromises with a demand for ritual animal sacrifice by offering a rooster made of flour. However, Jain theology dictates that because the psychological intent to kill was present, the spiritual degradation was identical to killing a living creature. Scholars note that this narrative was historically utilized to establish that the institutionalization of meat-eating corrupts the psychological purity of a society, regardless of who physically butchers the animal.

== Dietary structures and practice ==
For Jains, vegetarianism is mandatory. In 2021 it was found that 92% of self-identified Jains in India adhered to some type of vegetarian diet and another 5% seem to try to follow a mostly vegetarian diet by abstaining from eating certain kinds of meat and/or abstaining from eating meat on specific days.

According to Jainism even the smallest particles of the bodies of dead animals or eggs is unacceptable. Some Jain scholars and activists support veganism, as they believe the modern commercialised production of dairy products involves violence against farm animals. (Note: The consumption of dairy products, such as milk, curds and clarified butter (ghee), are not prohibited in the medieval texts. In recent times, out of concern for the treatment of cows in commercial dairy farming, some Jains in the diaspora and in India now observe a vegan diet and discourage the use of dairy products in temple rituals.)

=== Ascetic vs. lay vows ===
The strictest dietary rules are based on the Mahavratas (Great Vows) of the ascetics (munis and sādhvīs), whose goal is the complete cessation of all himsa, as detailed in the oldest scriptures like the Acaranga Sutra.

The laity (śrāvaka and śrāvikā) follows the Anuvratas ("Lesser Vows"), which are a practical approximation of this ascetic ideal. While all Jains are mandatorily vegetarian, the rigor in observing all rules (such as the avoidance of all anant-kay plants) may vary. This rigor often increases during holy periods like the Chaturmas (the four-month rains retreat) or due to an individual's changed preferences over time.

=== The Maha-vigai and Udumbara prohibitions ===
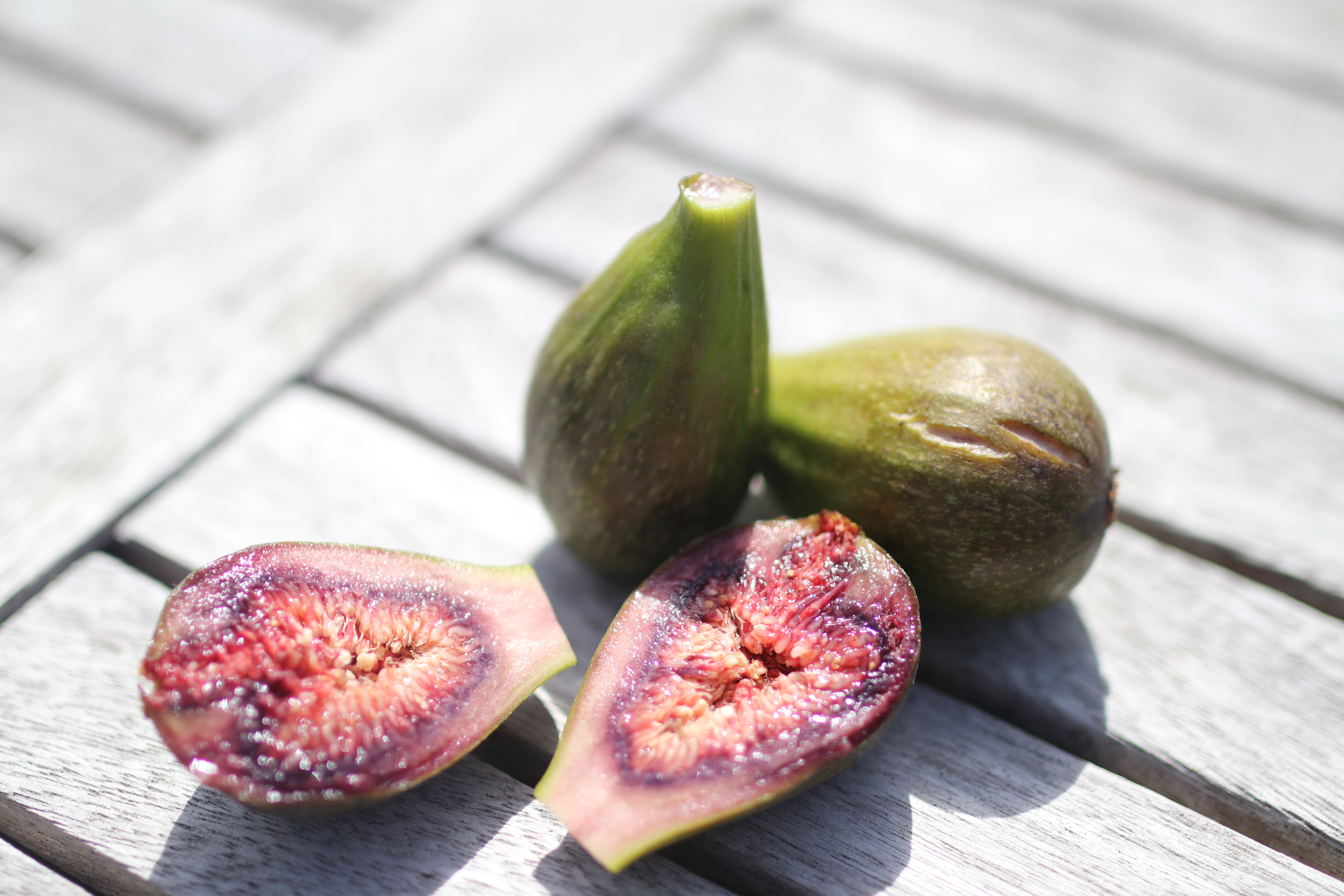
Fresh fig halves on wooden surface

According to Jain texts, a śrāvaka (householder) should not consume the four maha-vigai (the four perversions) – wine, flesh, butter, and honey; and the five udumbara fruits (the five udumbara trees are gular, anjeera, banyan, peepal, and pakar, all belonging to the fig genus). Lastly, Jains should not consume any foods or drinks that have animal products or animal flesh.

The prohibition of the five udumbara (fig) trees is deeply rooted in the biological reality of the fruit's development. Traditional figs are not standard fruits, but enclosed inflorescences (syconia) that rely on an obligate mutualistic symbiosis with pollinating fig wasps. To pollinate the internal flowers, a female wasp enters the fruit through a microscopic opening, losing her wings in the process and trapping herself inside. After laying her eggs, the wasp dies within the fruit. The fig subsequently secretes an enzyme known as ficin, which completely digests the dead insect into the fruit's tissues. Because consuming a traditional fig guarantees the ingestion of a digested multi-sensed insect, classical Jain texts explicitly ban the fruit as a severe violation of ahimsa (nonviolence).

Jains go out of their way so as not to hurt even small insects and other tiny animals, because they believe that harm caused by carelessness is as reprehensible as harm caused by deliberate action. Hence they take great pains to make sure that no minuscule animals are injured by the preparation of their meals and in the process of eating and drinking.

Mushrooms, fungi and yeasts are forbidden because they grow in unhygienic environments and may harbour other life forms.

Honey is forbidden, as its collection would amount to violence against the bees.

=== Prohibition of alcohol and intoxicants ===
While Jain dietary law heavily regulates fermentation protocols for food, alcoholic beverage (including wine, beer, and liquor) occupies a unique category of absolute prohibition due to its dual biological and psychological impact.

Biologically, the brewing and distillation processes require the intentional, large-scale cultivation and subsequent destruction of fermenting microorganisms, which constitutes a massive physical violation of ahimsa (non-violence). Jains strictly avoid these beverages to prevent the inevitable destruction of micro-life inherent in the fermentation process.

However, the primary philosophical objection to alcohol is psychological. The entire Jain ethical framework relies on the constant maintenance of mindfulness and vigilance (apramada) to avoid committing unintentional harm. Classical Jain texts explicitly ban alcohol because its intoxicating properties destroy this required cognitive discipline. The Puruṣārthasiddhyupāya, a foundational Jain text on lay ethics, articulates this mechanism directly, stating that wine deludes the mind, and a deluded person tends to forget piety. It further warns that the person who forgets piety inevitably commits hiṃsā (violence) without hesitation. Consequently, the consumption of alcohol is classified not merely as a dietary infraction, but as a severe catalyst that guarantees further acts of physical and mental violence.

Jains can however consume vanilla extract, as the very minuscule amount of alcohol in extract gets baked off completely in the cooking process. In addition, certain juices (apple juice, orange juice), breads/flours (via Amyloglucosidase and Saccharomyces cerevisiae) and portions of certain fruits as they ripen (bananas as they yellow, cherries, and pears) will contain a very minuscule amount of alcohol via the fructose, sucrose, and glucose sugars, similar to vanilla extract (and can be consumed by strict Jains).

=== Fermentation and time-dependent purity ===
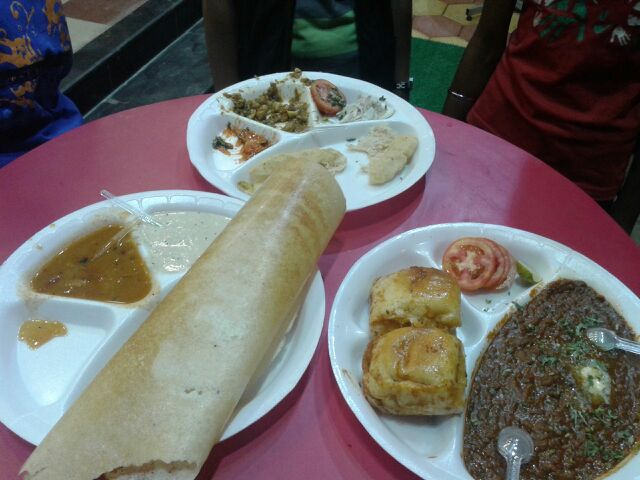
Jain dosa, Pav bhaji, Chole bhature

Jain dietary law places strict temporal limits on the preparation and consumption of food to prevent the exponential multiplication of microorganisms. According to Jain biological frameworks, cooked food that is left overnight or allowed to naturally ferment becomes a host for rapidly multiplying colonies of micro-life, rendering it stale or impure. Consequently, the permissibility of fermented foods depends entirely on the methodology and duration of preparation:

- Dairy and Curd (Yogurt): While dairy is generally permitted, strict Jain guidelines require that curd must be freshly set using a starter culture and consumed within a strict time window (typically the same day it is set). If curd is stored overnight or left to sour over several days, it is considered to harbor unacceptable levels of mobile microorganisms (trasa jiva) and is strictly forbidden.
- Fermented Batters (Dosa, Idli, Dhokla): Traditional South Indian and Gujarati recipes for batters like dosa, idli, and dhokla rely on prolonged, overnight natural fermentation. Because this process intentionally cultivates large microbial populations, these traditional overnight batters are restricted in strict Jain practice.
- Methodological Workarounds: To consume these dishes without violating ahimsa, Jain culinary practices have developed rapid-preparation alternatives. "Jain dosa" or dhokla is typically prepared either by consuming the batter immediately upon mixing, or by utilizing rapid chemical leavening agents (such as baking soda) to simulate the aeration of the dough, entirely bypassing the prolonged microbial breeding phase.

=== Chronobiology and Chauvihar ===
The practice of Chauvihar—the strict avoidance of all food and, in its most rigorous form, water between sunset and sunrise—is a cornerstone of Jain dietary discipline. Traditional Jain texts, such as the Puruṣārthasiddhyupāya, justify this practice by citing the dramatically increased risk of inadvertently consuming insects and microorganisms that become active and seek out light sources or food at night.

However, modern sociological and biological framing highlights the dual function of this practice. Historically, Chauvihar acted as a highly effective pre-industrial measure for pest control and food safety, ensuring meals were prepared and consumed only during hours of maximum visibility. Furthermore, scholars note that this ancient disciplinary practice directly mirrors modern physiological frameworks regarding chronobiology and circadian fasting, which emphasize the health benefits of strictly aligning food intake with daylight hours and resting the digestive system overnight.

=== Preparation and filtration ===
The Jain dietary framework applies the same rigorous microbiological conservation principles to water consumption as it does to solid food. To prevent the ingestion and destruction of microscopic aquatic life, traditional Jain practice mandates the strict filtration of all drinking water. Historically, this was achieved using a thick cotton cloth to filter water drawn from stepwells. Crucially, this process involved an environmental conservation practice known as jivani or bilchavani, where the inverted filter cloth was carefully washed with a small amount of filtered water to safely return the trapped microorganisms back to their original water source.

While modern municipal plumbing and piped water supplies have made returning these organisms to their original source practically impossible, many orthodox Jains continue to employ traditional filtration methods for tap water. To maintain this strict ethical baseline, some practitioners even extend this filtration requirement to commercial mineral or bottled drinking water.

=== Medicine and pharmaceuticals ===
The application of ahimsa to modern medicine presents a complex ethical negotiation for the Jain community. While the strict avoidance of animal products and intoxicants remains the baseline, Jain theological frameworks actively differentiate between intentional consumption for pleasure and unavoidable consumption for survival.

- Animal derivatives and gelatin: Many modern pharmaceuticals utilize gelatin (an animal byproduct) for drug encapsulation, or incorporate animal-derived compounds in supplements (such as fish oil). Orthodox Jains actively navigate this by seeking out vegetarian alternatives, prominently driving the demand for cellulose-based (HPMC) capsules and plant-based synthetic supplements to maintain their ethical purity.
- Alcohol-based medications: Liquid medications, such as medicinal syrups and tinctures, frequently contain alcohol as a solvent. Because alcohol is classified as a maha-vigai (major perversion) that destroys the cognitive mindfulness required to practice ahimsa, strict practitioners regularly request alcohol-free medical alternatives.
- The principle of medical necessity: Despite these rigorous strictures, Jain lay ethics generally permit the use of essential, life-saving medications that may contain restricted ingredients if no viable vegetarian alternative exists. This practical leniency is rooted in the preservation of human life, which is viewed as a rare and necessary vehicle for practicing dharma (righteousness) and eventually achieving liberation. Conversely, Jain ascetics (monks and nuns) strictly bound by the Mahavratas (Great Vows) often refuse such medical leniencies, occasionally choosing to embrace Sallekhana (a peaceful, voluntary fasting to death) rather than violating their vows of nonviolence to prolong their physical bodies.

== Fasting and dietary asceticism ==
In Jainism, the dietary baseline of vegetarianism is frequently augmented by rigorous periods of fasting (tapa). While the standard Jain diet is designed to prevent the influx of new karmic matter (asrava), fasting is utilized as the primary mechanism to actively burn off and shed existing karma attached to the soul (nirjara).

Fasting within the Jain community exists in a multitude of forms, heavily modifying what can be consumed. Beyond complete abstinence from food and water, specific dietary fasts are practiced to conquer the senses and attachments to taste. A prominent example is the Ayambil fast, where practitioners consume only a single meal a day consisting of a single type of grain, entirely devoid of spices, salt, oil, dairy, or sugar. Furthermore, during major religious observances such as Paryushana, strict Jains temporarily elevate their dietary restrictions by avoiding all green leafy vegetables in addition to the standard restriction on root vegetables.

This practice of dietary asceticism is not limited to monks but is a defining pillar of lay Jain identity. Sociological surveys indicate that fasting remains a highly prevalent cultural practice; a 2021 demographic study found that 84% of self-identified Jains in India partake in some form of fasting.

== Ethics in finance and capital allocation ==
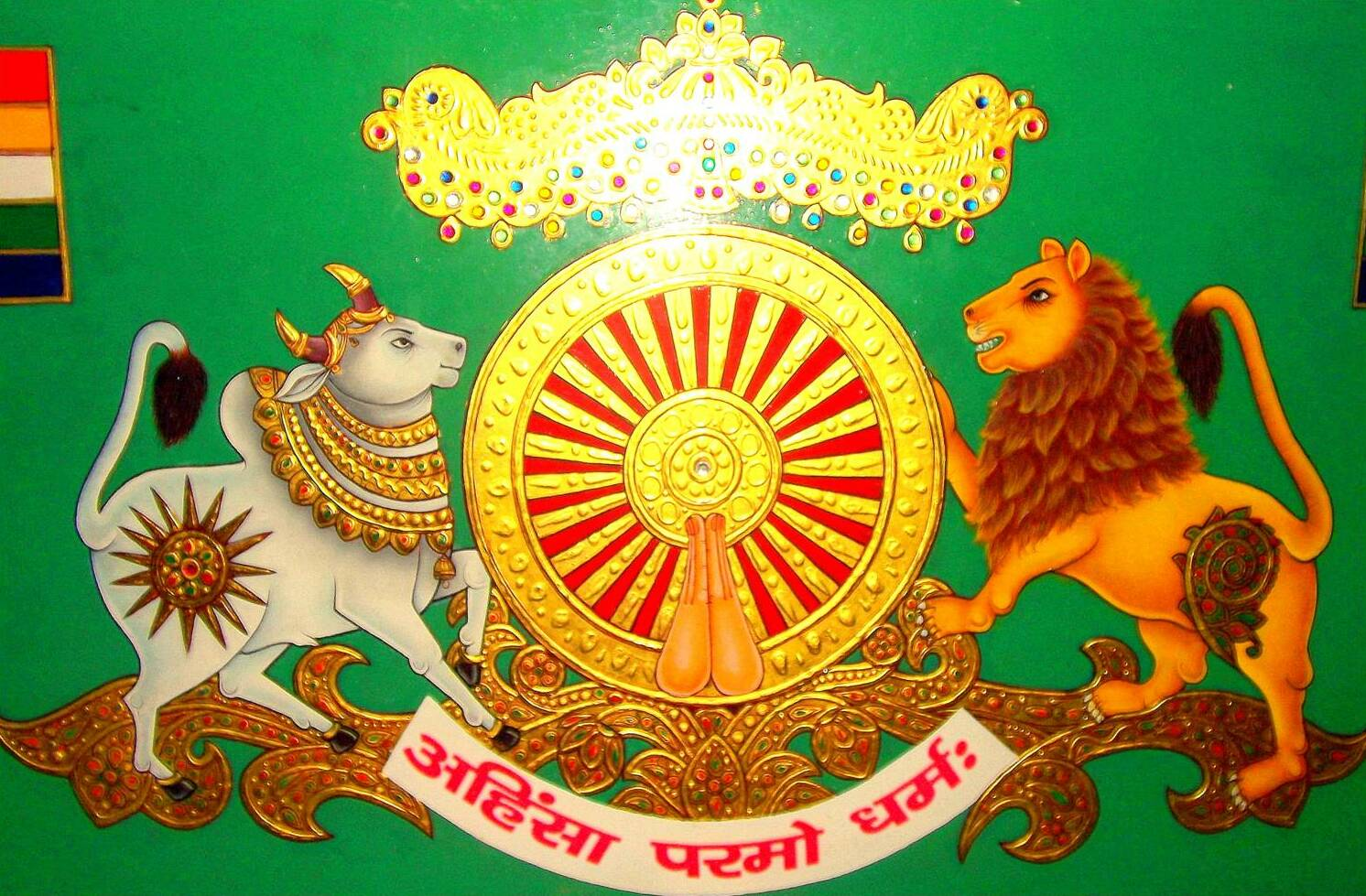
Painting in a Jain temple with the statement "ahiṃsā paramo dharma" (non-injury is the highest virtue/religion)

The Jain commitment to ahimsa (non-violence) created a sophisticated framework for financial ethics, prioritizing the psychological intent of the investor alongside the physical outcome of the investment. This institutionalized practice serves as a historical precursor to modern Negative Screening and ESG (Environmental, Social, and Governance) investing.

=== Negative screening and the 15 forbidden trades ===
The traditional list of 15 forbidden trades (karmadanas) acts as a rigorous filter for capital allocation. Jain finance networks historically prohibited the use of funds in industries reliant on animal exploitation—specifically leather manufacturing, poultry farming, and the trade of ivory or silk.

=== Indigenous banking and parallel systems ===
To ensure community capital was not inadvertently utilized by "violent" industries through generalized banking channels, Jain mercantile guilds developed independent credit systems (such as the Hundi network). These systems allowed for capital flow while maintaining strict ethical oversight.

=== Aparigraha and philanthropic capital ===
The principle of aparigraha (non-possession) dictates that wealth should be utilized for the welfare of all living beings once personal needs are met. This has led to the structural allocation of capital toward Jivdaya (animal hospitals) and the establishment of Gaushalas (protective shelters for cattle), which are viewed as essential components of an ethical financial ecosystem.

== Apparel, accessories, and footwear ==
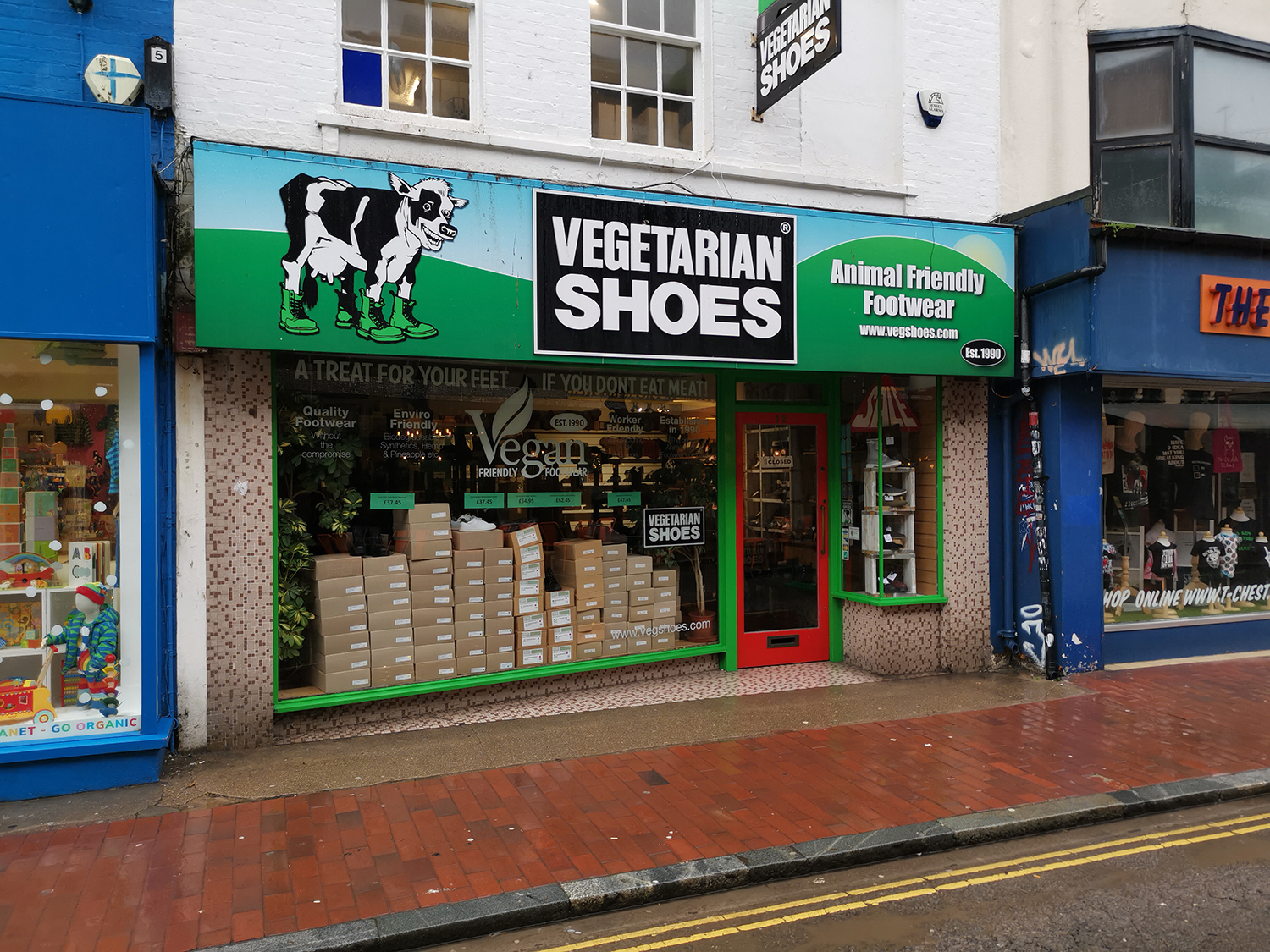
The Vegetarian Shoes shop in Brighton (Gardner St.) in January 2020

Jainism extends the dietary principle of nonviolence to all forms of material consumption, particularly apparel. The sensory hierarchy of life dictates the ethical "cost" of every material, leading to specific prohibitions on products derived from multi-sensed beings.

=== Leather and fur ===
Strict adherence to ahimsa involves the absolute avoidance of apparel, footwear and fashion accessories (like belts, wallets, purses, handbags etc.) made from animal hides or fur. The production of these materials requires the slaughter of five-sensed mammals (panchendriya). Because these animals possess the highest level of sensory perception and experience profound physical pain, the consumption or trade of their byproducts constitutes a massive karmic violation. Historically, orthodox Jains navigated this restriction by utilizing footwear made from carved wood or thick woven cloth. In contemporary urban environments, this ethical baseline is maintained through the adoption of vegan leather and sustainable synthetic alternatives.

=== Traditional silk ===
Traditional sericulture requires the boiling of intact cocoons to harvest unbroken silk threads, resulting in the mass slaughter of silkworm pupae. Within Jain biological taxonomy, silkworms are classified as multi-sensed, mobile beings (trasa jiva); thus, their intentional destruction incurs a severe karmic penalty that far exceeds the harvesting of one-sensed plant life.

To maintain their rigorous commitment to ahimsa, Jain consumers and merchants historically avoided the silk trade entirely, favoring cotton or other plant-based textiles. In contemporary practice, this adherence to non-violence has led to the Jain community's prominent advocacy for "Ahimsa silk" (also known as peace silk). This alternative production methodology allows the moth to naturally emerge and complete its life cycle before the ruptured cocoon is harvested, effectively aligning textile consumption with the religion's strict dietary ethics.

=== Ivory and pearls ===
The prohibition of animal-derived accessories extends strictly to luxury items such as ivory and pearls. The harvesting of these materials necessitates the slaughter, mutilation, or severe distress of highly developed, multi-sensed beings—specifically elephants (panchendriya, five-sensed mammals) and pearl oysters (classified as multi-sensed, mobile beings or trasa jiva). Because the procurement of these specific luxury goods is fundamentally rooted in extreme physical violence and the direct violation of ahimsa, Jain ethical codes historically barred their trade and consumption. To maintain their ethical baselines without compromising on aesthetics, Jain artisans and consumers historically substituted these materials with cruelty-free alternatives such as intricately carved wood, glass, or plant-based resins.

== Sociological and nutritional perspectives ==
While Jain dietary strictures are theologically rooted in the ethics of nonviolence, modern sociologists and anthropologists frequently analyze these practices through the lens of social boundary-making and caste dynamics. In contemporary India, the strict insistence on food purity and the avoidance of cross-contamination can function as mechanisms of socio-economic exclusion. Scholars note that the statistical reluctance of orthodox Jains to consume food prepared by non-vegetarians, combined with the modern phenomenon of "Jain-only" residential housing societies, parallels traditional caste-purity practices, which critics argue effectively reinforces class and religious segregation in urban environments.

From a nutritional and medical perspective, the traditional lacto-vegetarian Jain diet is generally considered well-balanced, as the heavy reliance on dairy consumption provides essential nutrients often lacking in plant-based diets, most notably vitamin B_{12} and calcium. However, with the increasing modern transition of some orthodox and diaspora Jains toward strict veganism—driven by ethical objections to mechanized dairy farming—dietitians highlight the necessity of proactive nutritional management. Because the Jain diet additionally excludes nutrient-dense root vegetables, contemporary practitioners adopting veganism are routinely advised to utilize fortified foods or synthetic B-complex supplements to prevent long-term neurological and hematological deficiencies.

== Influence on vegetarian cuisines in India ==
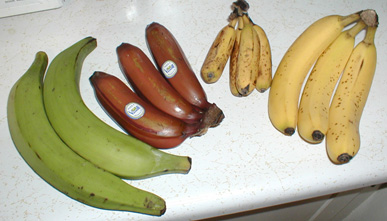
Fruits of four different cultivars. Left to right: plantain, red banana, apple banana, and Cavendish banana

The rigorous dietary ethics of Jainism have profoundly shaped the broader culinary landscapes of the Indian subcontinent, particularly in regions with historically dense Jain mercantile populations such as Gujarat, Rajasthan, and Central India.

=== Regional culinary innovation ===
Because Jain dietary law strictly prohibits the use of foundational flavor bases like onions and garlic, as well as texturally significant root vegetables like potatoes, Jain communities drove significant regional culinary innovation. In Gujarati Jain cuisine and Marwari Jain cuisine, cooks historically substituted these restricted ingredients with raw plantains (unripe bananas), grated cabbage, and specific gourds to replicate the bulk and texture of root vegetables. Furthermore, the absence of pungent alliums like garlic and onion popularized the heavy use of substitute spices—most notably asafoetida (hing), cumin, and mustard seeds—which became defining flavor profiles of western Indian vegetarian cooking.

=== Standardization in modern hospitality ===
Beyond regional homes, Jain dietary restrictions have deeply influenced modern commercial hospitality in India. Due to the strict requirement of avoiding cross-contamination with non-vegetarian food or restricted vegetables, "Jain Food" has become a standardized, formally recognized catering category. Today, most major Indian airlines, railway networks (such as the IRCTC), and international hotel chains operating in India offer a dedicated "Jain Menu" or "Jain Meal" option. This standardization serves not only practicing Jains but also caters to broader demographics seeking the highest tier of vegetarian purity and hygienic food preparation in commercial settings.

According to survey responses of Indian Jains who identified themselves as vegetarians, 92% would be unwilling to eat at a restaurant that is not exclusively vegetarian and 89% would be unwilling to eat at the home of a friend/acquaintance who is not a vegetarian as well.

== Comparison with other religions ==
The extent to which this intention is put into effect varies greatly among Hindus, Buddhists and Jains. Jains believe nonviolence is the most essential religious duty for everyone (ahinsā paramo dharmaḥ, a statement often inscribed on Jain temples). It is an indispensable condition for liberation from the cycle of reincarnation, which is the ultimate goal of all Jain activities. Jains share this goal with Hindus and Buddhists, but their approach is particularly rigorous and comprehensive. Out of the five types of living beings, a householder is forbidden to kill, or destroy, intentionally, all except the lowest (the one sensed, such as vegetables, herbs, cereals, etc., which are endowed with only the sense of touch).

== See also ==
- Lacto-vegetarianism
- Fruitarianism
- Veganism
- Indian cuisine
- List of diets
- Sattvic diet
- Vegetarian cuisine
- Vegetarianism and religion
- Vitalism (Jainism)
- Vegetarianism and ecology
