= Bhava (disambiguation) =

Bhava may be:

- Bhava is a name of the Hindu god Shiva
- Bhava, a philosophical concept in Buddhism
- Bhava samadhi, which is the channeling of emotional energies into single-pointed devotion
- Bhāva (Hinduism) a mood, emotion or devotional state of mind
- Bhava (mood), a mental state mentioned in the Natya Shastra
- Bhava (king), a king mentioned in the Vedas
- Bhava in Yoga refers to any of a series of ascending religious moods
- Bhāva, in jyotisha is a house; one of the 12 divisions of the sky relative to the visible horizon
- Bhavabhuti, ancient Indian writer
- Bhava (fish), a monospecific genus of freshwater fish
