= Fashion accessory =

Item used to contribute to the wearer's outfit

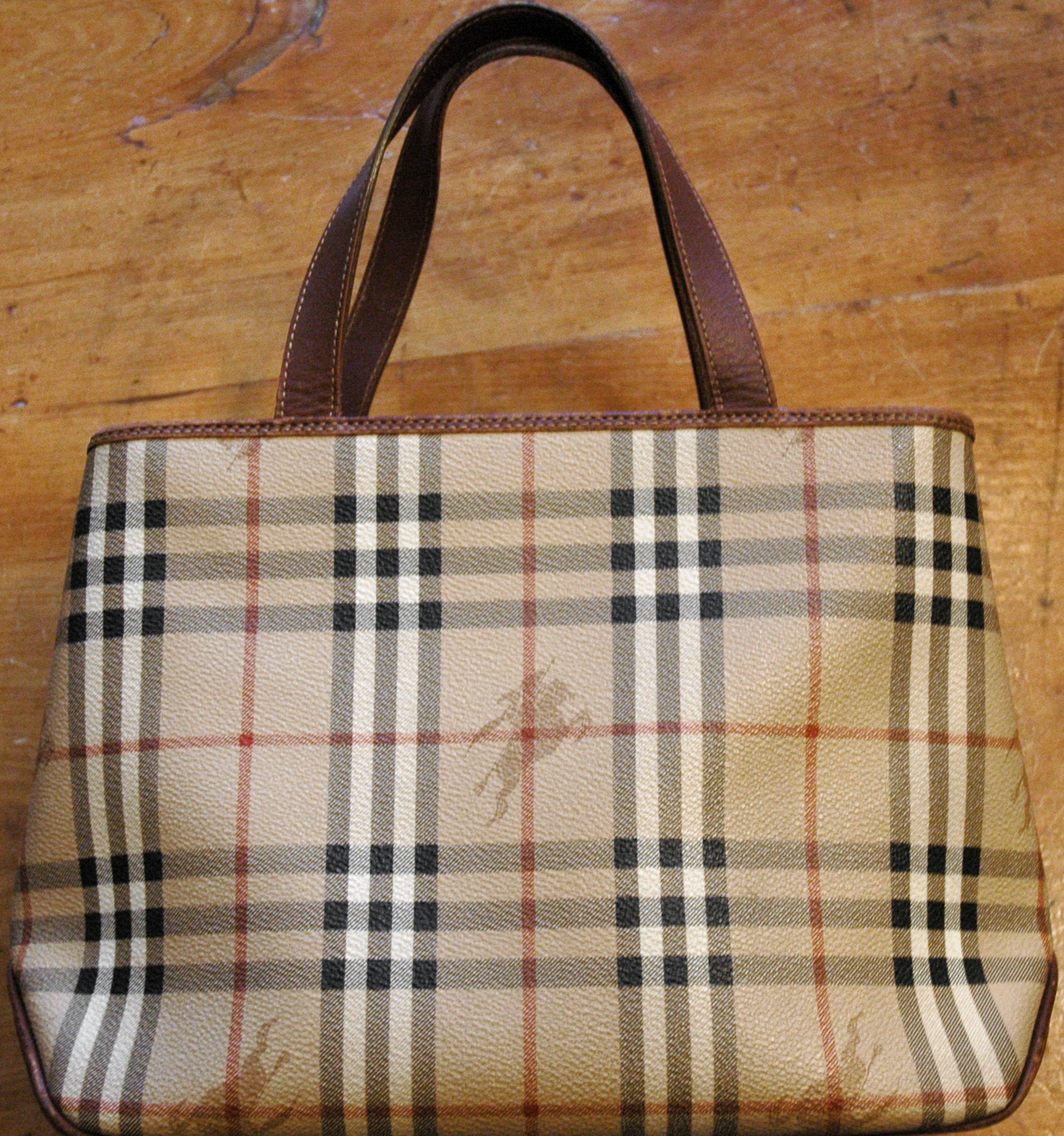
Burberry-brand handbag

In fashion, an accessory is an item used to contribute, in a secondary manner, to an individual's outfit. Accessories are often chosen to complete an outfit and complement the wearer's look. They have the capacity to further express an individual's identity and personality. Accessories come in different shapes, sizes, hues, etc. The term came into use in the 16th century.

== Types ==
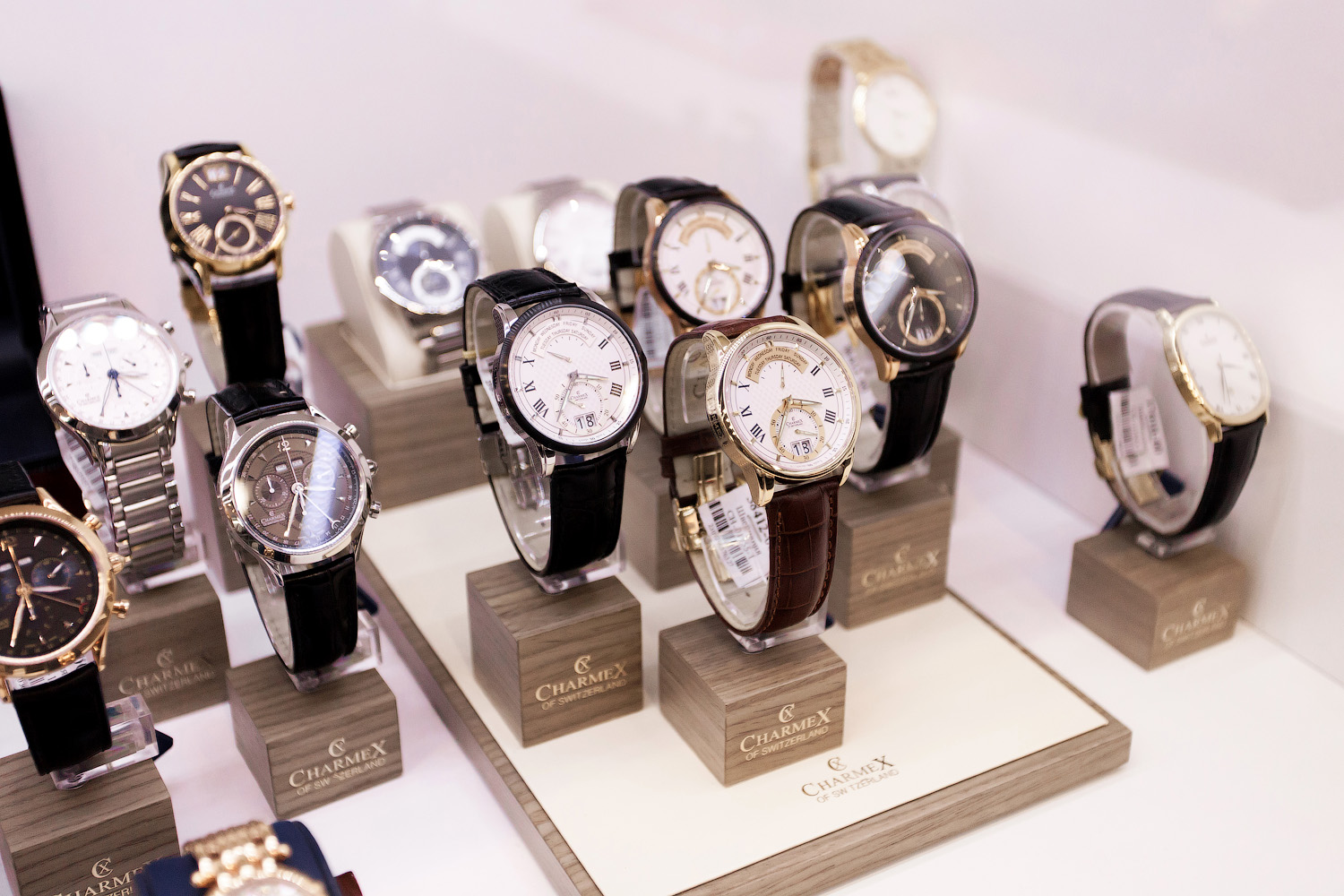
Watches are one type of fashion accessory.

Fashion accessories may be loosely categorized into two general areas: carried accessories and worn accessories. Carried accessories include purses and handbags, hand fans, parasols and umbrellas, wallets, canes, and ceremonial swords. Worn accessories include cravats, ties, hats, bonnets, belts and suspenders, gloves, muffs, necklaces, bracelets, watches, (Note: "Many watch manufacturers have capitalized on the acceptance of the watch as a fashion accessory and have entered into licensing agreements with designers.") eyewear, sashes, shawls, scarves, lanyards, socks, pins, body jewellery, rings, stockings and hair ties.

Footwear, including shoes and boots, can also function as a fashion accessory, particularly when its design contributes to an outfit's appearance. The type of accessory that an individual chooses to wear or carry to complement their outfit can be determined by several factors, including the specific context of where the individual is going. For example, if an individual is going to work their choice of accessory would differ from someone who is going out to drinks or dinner; thus depending on work or play different accessories would be chosen. Similarly, an individual's economic status, religious and cultural background would also be a contributing factor.

== History ==
Advertisement for millinery, embroideries, and fancy goods from the Macon City Directory, 1860

In Victorian fashion accessories such as fans, parasols and gloves held significance for how women experienced gender, race, and class. In this era, there was a trend for women to adopt, or aspire to, a more leisurely lifestyle. Consequently, gloves were often used by women to cover their hands and mask any signs of labour. One fashion accessory commonly worn by women in Victorian England was the slide bracelet. Slide bracelets were worn after the wrist watch came into fashion.

During the early 16th century, in Italy hat badges were worn by civilian men of higher social status as a decorative item, in imitation of the cap badges worn by the invading military. Hat badges were often worn in conjunction with a decorative sword and hilt. Hat badges were fashioned after plaquettes and often depicted a scene with personal relevance to the wearer.

In early nineteenth-century European fashion, accessories such as shawls and small drawstring handbags known as reticules became important elements of women's dress. Shawls, particularly those associated with Kashmiri textiles, were prominent in fashionable wardrobes during the period.

== See also ==
- Status symbol
- Fashion design copyright
