= Non-vegetarian food in India =

Non-vegetarian food and culture in India

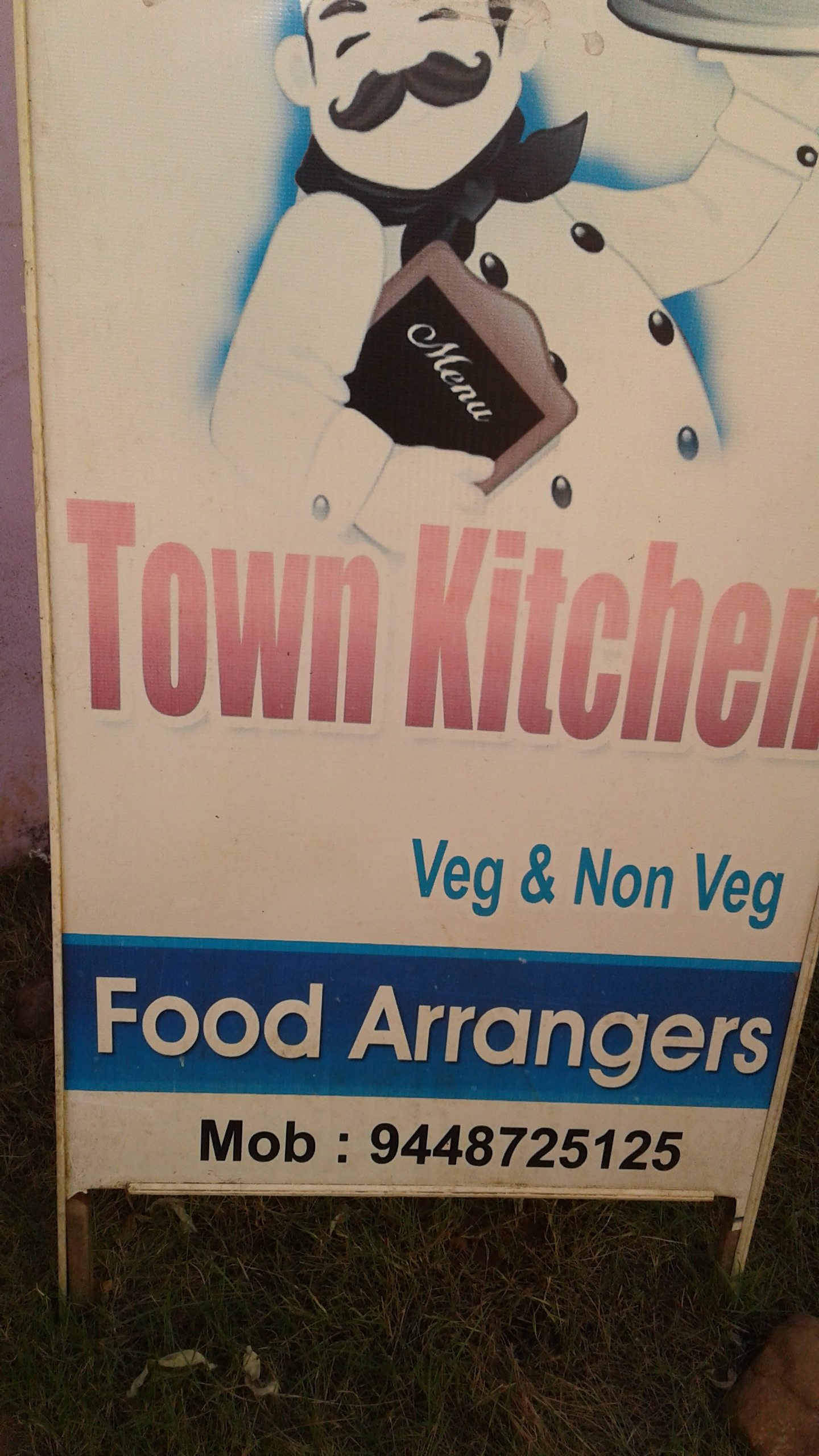
Caterer's ad board in Karnataka, India

Non-vegetarian food (in Indian English sometimes shortened to non-veg food) contains meat (red meat, poultry, seafood, or the flesh of any other animal), and sometimes, eggs. The term is common in India, but not usual elsewhere. In the generally vegetarian environment of India, restaurants offering meat and fish usually have a "non-vegetarian" section of their menu, and may include the term (typically as "Veg and Non-veg") in their name-boards and advertising. When describing people, non-vegetarians eat meat and/or eggs, as opposed to vegetarians. But in India, consumption of dairy foods is usual for both groups.

Non-vegetarianism is the majority human diet in the world (including India). Non-vegetarians are also called omnivores in nutritional science.

== First known use of the term ==
According to the Online Etymology Dictionary, the word 'vegetarian' might have started to be used irregularly around 1839. The word came into general usage after the formation of the Vegetarian Society in 1847 at Ramsgate (UK). According to Merriam Webster, the first known usage of the term nonvegetarian was in 1883.

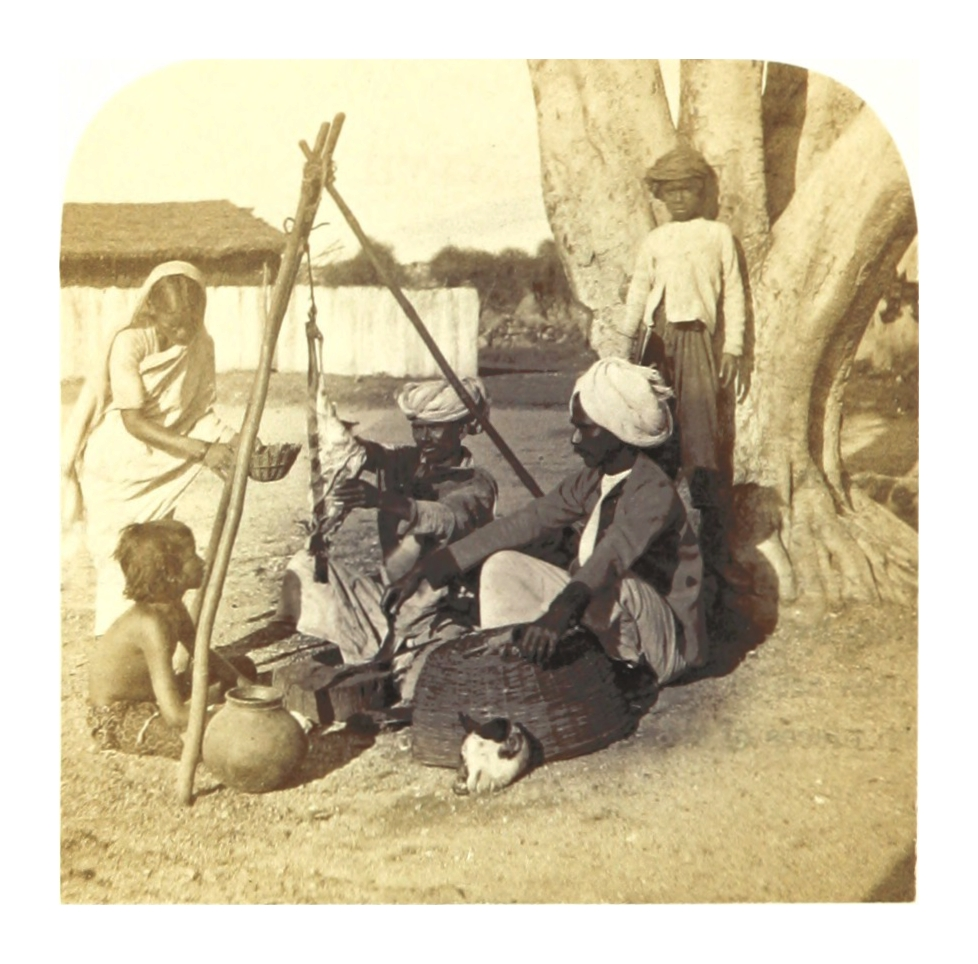
An enhanced image of Hindoo Butcher shop in Hyderabad, India c. 1862

== Demographics ==
Around 91-92% of humans worldwide are non-vegetarian in that they are neither ovo-lacto- vegetarians nor vegans, according to a 2018 survey by Ipsos Mori. 74% of the world's population "Regularly eat both animal and non-animal products", 14% "Only occasionally eat meat or fish", and 3% "Do not eat meat but do eat fish". Only 3% are vegan, i. e. eat no animal products at all. The dietary categories in the survey do not map directly onto the Indian definitions of vegetarianism and nonvegetarianism. The number of nonvegetarians worldwide under the Indian definition (consumption of other animal products than cows milk, derived products, and honey) lies between 91 and 97%.

75% of Indians are not vegetarian, according to the Indian National Family Health Survey (NFHS 2005–06).^{:56} According to the 2015–16 NFHS survey, the number is 78% for women and 70% for men.^{:303, 337}

BBC India correspondent Soutik Biswas said in April 2018: "New research by US-based anthropologist Balmurli Natrajan and India-based economist Suraj Jacob, points to a heap of evidence that even estimations of 29% vegetarian population are inflated estimations because of "cultural and political pressures". So people under-report eating meat - particularly beef - and over-report eating vegetarian food. Taking all this into account, say the researchers, only about 20% of Indians are actually vegetarian - much lower than common claims and stereotypes suggest". The authors that Biswas referred to measured "cultural and political pressures" with the vote share falling to the Hindu nationalist Bharatiya Janata Party (BJP). They argued that Indian Muslims and scheduled castes under-reported their beef-eating because reported beef-eating per state was negatively associated with the number of cows per inhabitant.

=== By gender ===
Overall, 43% of Indian women and 49% of men consumed fish, chicken or meat weekly, according to the National Family Health Survey, 2015–16.

More men than women eat non-vegetarian food in India; almost three in ten women do not consume eggs (29%) and chicken, fish or meat (30%) compared to two in ten men who do not consume eggs (20%) and chicken, fish or meat (22%).

Among women between 15 and 45 years of age, 45% have milk and curd, 45% have pulses or beans and 47% have dark green, leafy vegetables daily while 37% eat eggs and 37% eat fish, chicken or meat weekly. Around half (52%) of them have fruits occasionally.

=== By education, religion, and caste ===
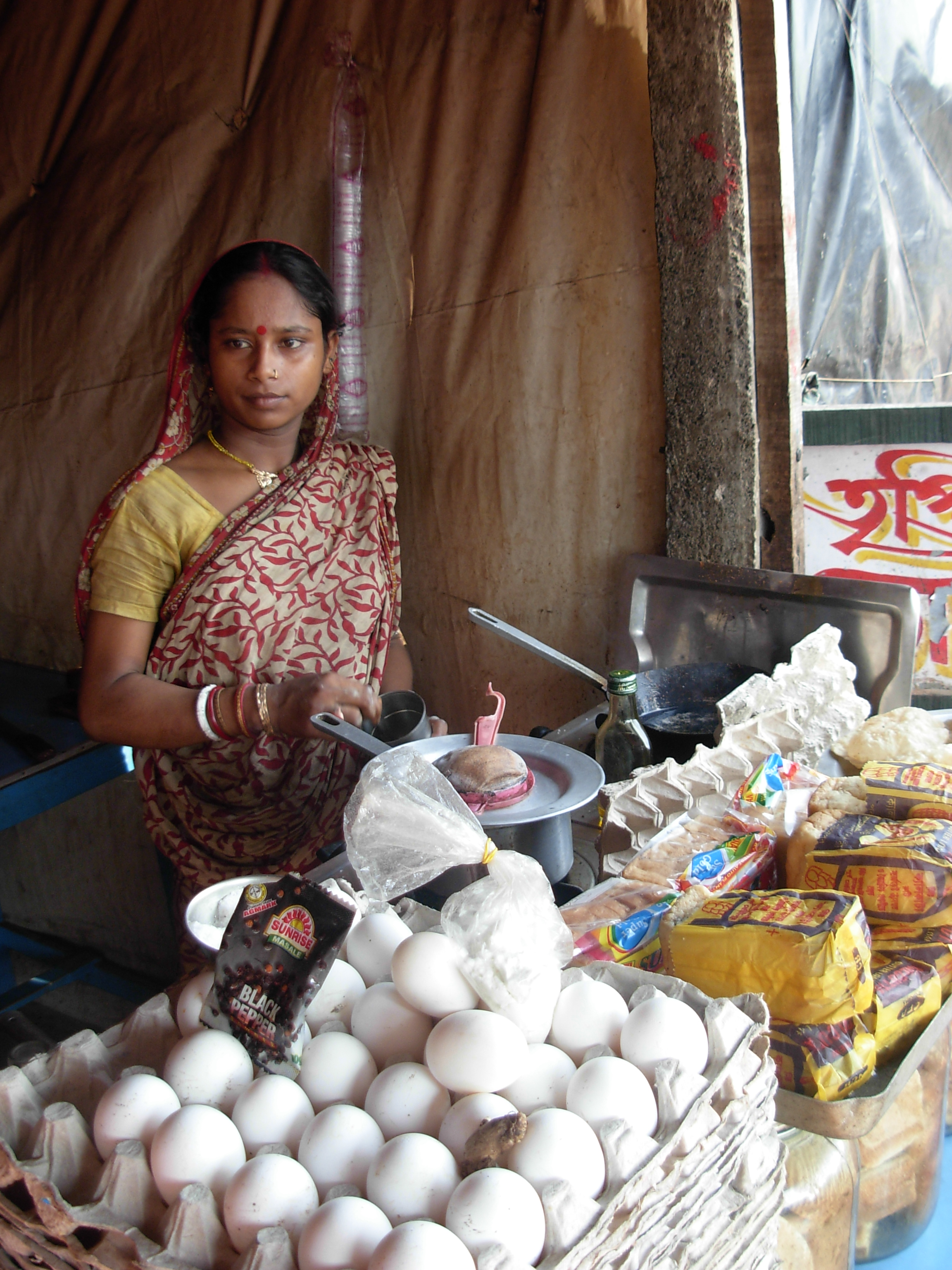
A Sea beach Hotel & Restaurant, New Digha West Bengal, India

Education appears to decide the choice of vegetarian/non-vegetarian foods. Those who have studied up to five years eat the highest amount of eggs and meat; men (54% and 58%) and women (48% and 52%).

Among religions, Christians consume eggs and meat the most; men 71.5% and 76% and women 65% and 74%, respectively. This is followed by Muslim men (66.5% and 73%) and women (60% and 67%).^{:340, 339} Most Hindus avoid beef, which is considered a taboo.

The highest consumption of eggs and fish, chicken or meat is among those who said they did not know their caste—men (49% and 52%). This holds true for women as well for eggs; for fish, chicken and meat it is highest in ‘other’ caste.

=== By state ===
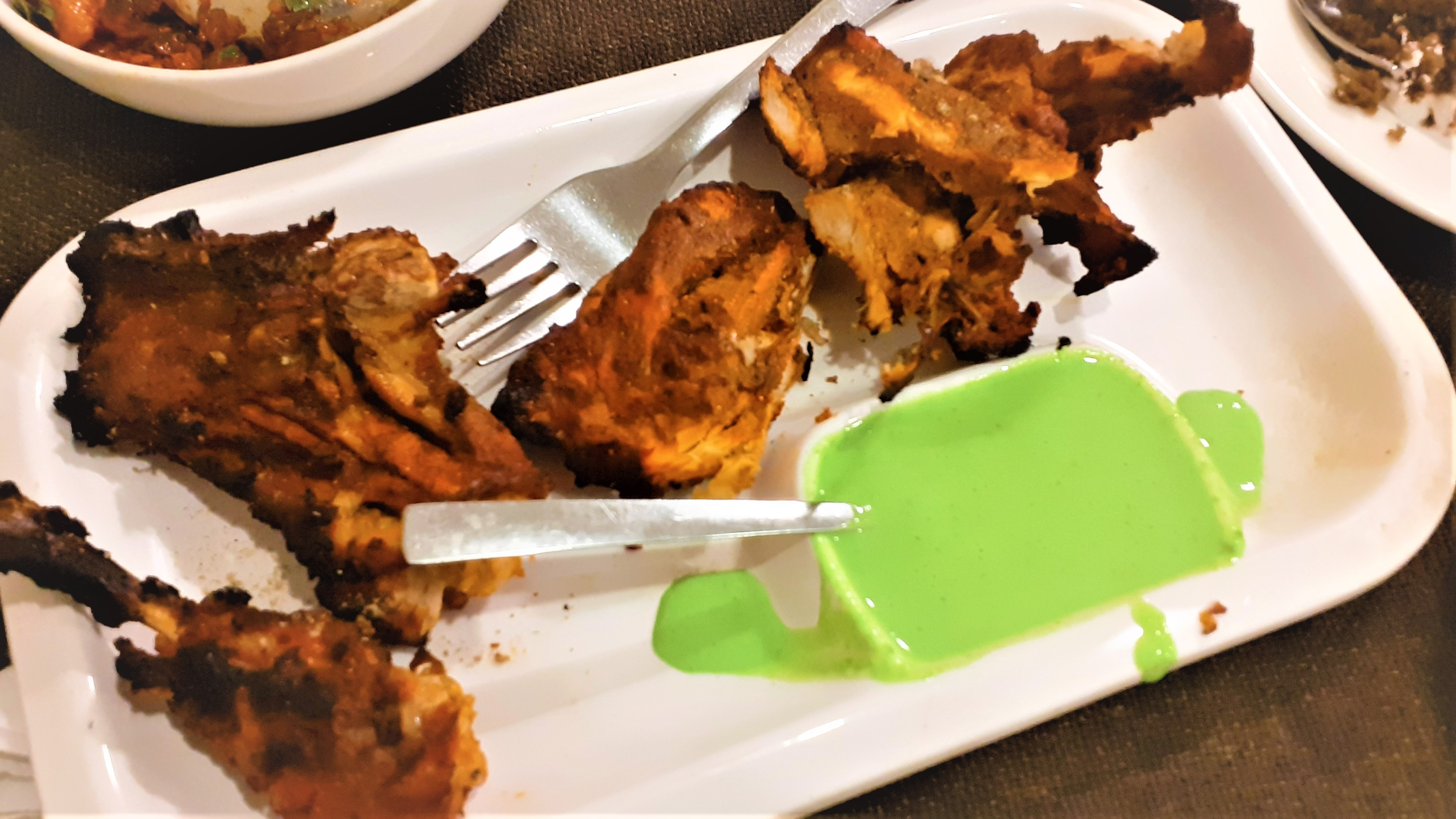
Tandoori Chicken dish at restaurant in Seoni, Madhya Pradesh, India

Data on women show that Kerala (93%), Goa (86%) and Assam (80%) have the highest weekly consumers of fish, chicken or meat while Punjab (4%), Rajasthan (6%) and Haryana (8%) rank the lowest.

Figures for men show that Tripura (95%), Kerala (90%) and Goa (88%) are the highest weekly consumers of fish, chicken or meat while Punjab (10%), Rajasthan (10%) and Haryana (13%) are the lowest.

== History ==
According to archeological finds, Indus Valley civilisation had dominance of meat diet of animals such as cattle, buffalo, goat, pig and chicken. Remnants of dairy products were also discovered. According to Akshyeta Suryanarayan et al., (Note: A large proportion of data however remains ambiguous. Reliable local isotopic references for fats and oils are unavailable, and lipid levels in IVC vessels are quite low.) available evidence indicates culinary practices to be common over the region; food-constituents were dairy products (in low proportion), ruminant carcass meat, and either non-ruminant adipose fats, plants, or mixtures of these products. The dietary pattern remained same throughout the decline.

== Cultural and political aspects ==
The term non-vegetarian has been criticized by the blogger The Last Caveman as a misnomer and a casteist pejorative with origins attributed to the caste system in India.

Vegetarianism and casteism in modern India
The term non-vegetarian is a good case in point. It signals the social
power of vegetarian classes, including their power to classify foods,
to create a 'food hierarchy' wherein vegetarian food is the default and
is having a higher status than meat. Thus it is akin to the term
'non-whites' coined by 'whites' to capture an incredibly diverse
population who they colonised.

— Balmurli Natrajan, anthropologist, and Suraj Jacob, economist, 2018

A 2018 study from Economic and Political Weekly by US-based anthropologist Balmurli Natrajan and India-based economist Suraj Jacob suggests that the percentage of vegetarians is about 20%. Percentages vary by household income and caste. The study argues that meat-eating behavior is underreported because consumption of meat, especially beef, is "caught in cultural, political, and group identity struggles in India". According to 2015-16 data from the National Family Health Survey (NFHS), the share of vegetarianism has declined from 2005 to 2006. Vegetarianism is less common amongst non-Hindu Indian religious groups such as Muslims and Christians. Vegetarianism is most common amongst Brahmins, Lingayat, Sikhs and Jains in India. Increases in meat consumption in India have been attributed to urbanisation, increasing disposable income, consumerism and cross-cultural influences.

According to Sameer of The Siasat Daily (Hyderabad), for ritual animal qurbani i.e. sacrifice on Eid-ul-Adha celebrants traditionally used to buy sacrificial animals, find butcher and had to find place for slaughtering of sacrificial animals on their own, but as of tradition is changing slowly and celebrants are increasingly opting for Qurbani services accomplish all the necessary tasks in hygienic manner.

== In popular usage ==
In India, labeling of packaged food products is mandatory to distinguish between vegetarian (green) products and non-vegetarian (brown).

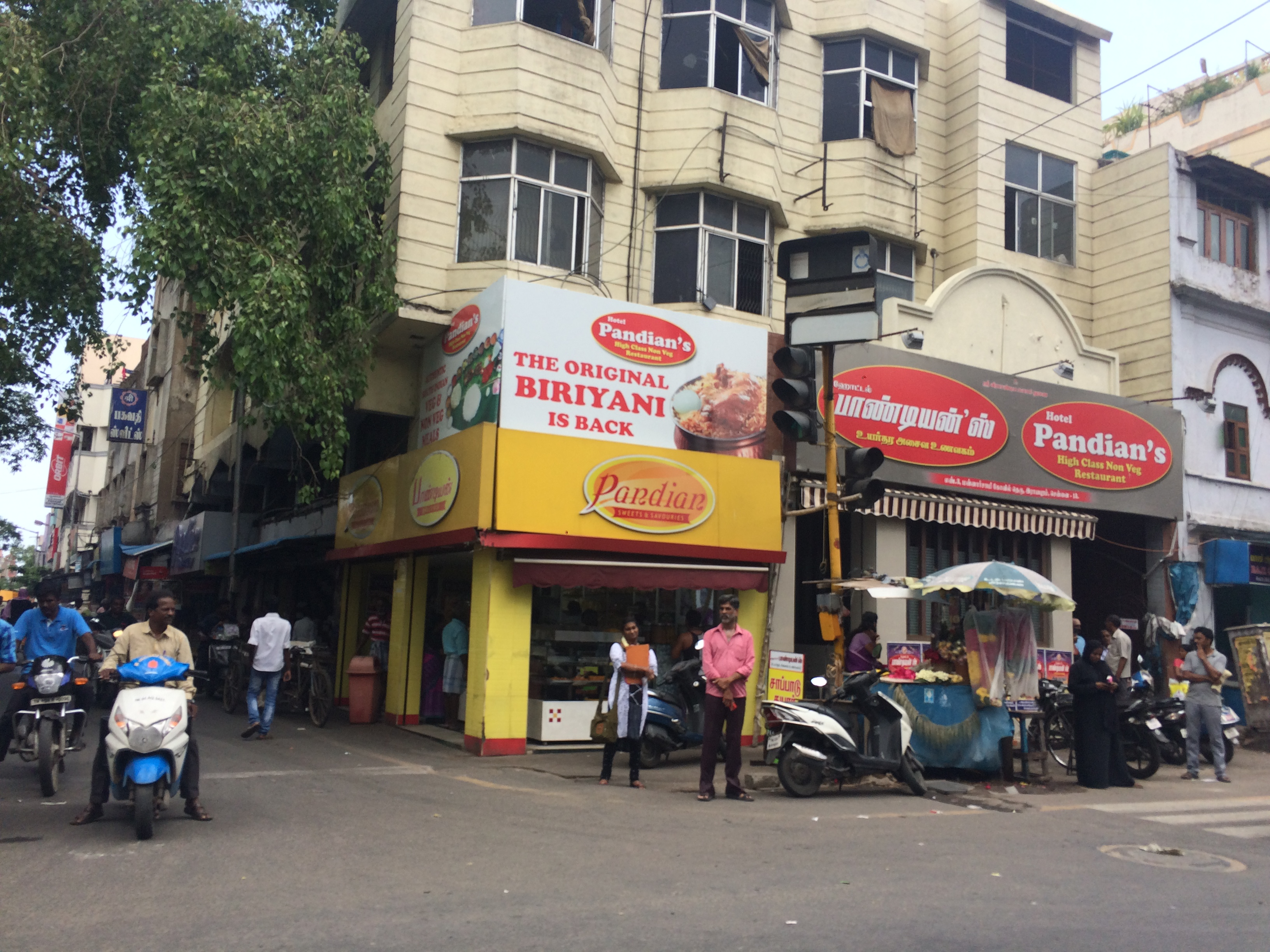
A "High Class Non Veg restaurant" in Tondiarpet, Chennai (right)

=== Right to information ===
In India, it is mandatory that packaged food products be marked with Vegetarian and non-vegetarian marks, which are green and reddish-brown symbols. The symbol was introduced by Food Safety and Standards (Packaging and Labelling) Act of 2006, and received a mandatory status with its 2011 revision. It defines non-vegetarian food as "any food which contains whole or part of any animal including birds, marine animals, eggs, or products of any animal origin as an ingredient, excluding milk or milk products". A December 2021 Delhi High court instruction reminds all food business operators “to ensure complete and strict adherence of Regulation 2.2.2(4)”, (“i.e. Declaration regarding Veg or Non veg”.. in whatever amount of percentage, what is sourced from animals, would render the food article as Non-Vegetarian, and need to be declared) and noted that “failure…to adherence…would expose [them] to, inter alia, class action for violation of the fundamental rights of the consumers and might invite punitive damages, apart from prosecution”.

- For following paragraph derived from judgement of Supreme Court of India Section 52(1)(q) (iv) of the Indian Copyright Act, 1957 allows for the reproduction or publication of-any judgement or order of a court:

In Indian Soaps & Toiletries Makers ... vs Ozair Husain & Ors on 7 March 2013, Supreme Court of India declined plea for mandating medicinal drug companies to provide information on food based vegetarian or non-vegetarian origins. The Supreme Court while accepting the freedom of speech and expression would include the right to receive information under Article 19(1)(a) of the Constitution the court considered Government of India's contention that it may not be desirable for the patient or his attendant to know the origin of the ingredients of the drug i.e. whether ‘vegetarian’ or ‘non- vegetarian’. Such option cannot be left on the patient or his attendant if required to save the life or eradicate a disease. In some circumstances the condition of a patient may be such that a drug which is ordinarily not treated as a life saving drug may be essential to save the life. The information about the origin of the ingredients of a drug or cosmetic, if claimed as a matter of right, a vegetarian can also claim information about the origin of a vegetarian ingredient, depending upon his food habit. The court says food habits in India vary from person to person and place to place. Religion too plays a vital role in making such habit. Those who follow ‘Jainism’ are vegetarian but many of them do not eat some of the vegetarian food such as potato, carrot, onion, garlic etc. which are grown below the earth. Majority of Indians treat ‘honey’ and ‘lactose’ (milk derived sugar) as vegetarian but scientists treat them as ‘non-vegetarian’ products. Amongst the non-vegetarians a number of persons are ‘eggetarian’ i.e. those who only take one non-vegetarian product–egg. They do not eat other non-vegetarian food like animal, fish or birds. There are number of persons who treat egg as vegetarian food. Even amongst non-vegetarians, a large number of persons do not take beef or ham/pork because of religious belief. Many of the non-vegetarians do not eat snakes, insects, frog or bird. In individual case, the Government may feel difficulty in specifying the origin of a ‘vegetarian’ or ‘non-vegetarian’ ingredient, if a person wants to know the definite origin of such ‘vegetarian’ or ‘non- vegetarian’ ingredient on the basis of his food habit. It is imperative for the State to ensure the availability of the right to the citizens to receive information. But such information can be given to the extent it is available and possible, without affecting the fundamental right of others. Hence right to information can be limited by reasonable restrictions under the law made for the purpose mentioned in the Article 19(2) of the Constitution (in the case of Medicinal drugs).

- End of paragraph derived from Supreme Court of India judgement

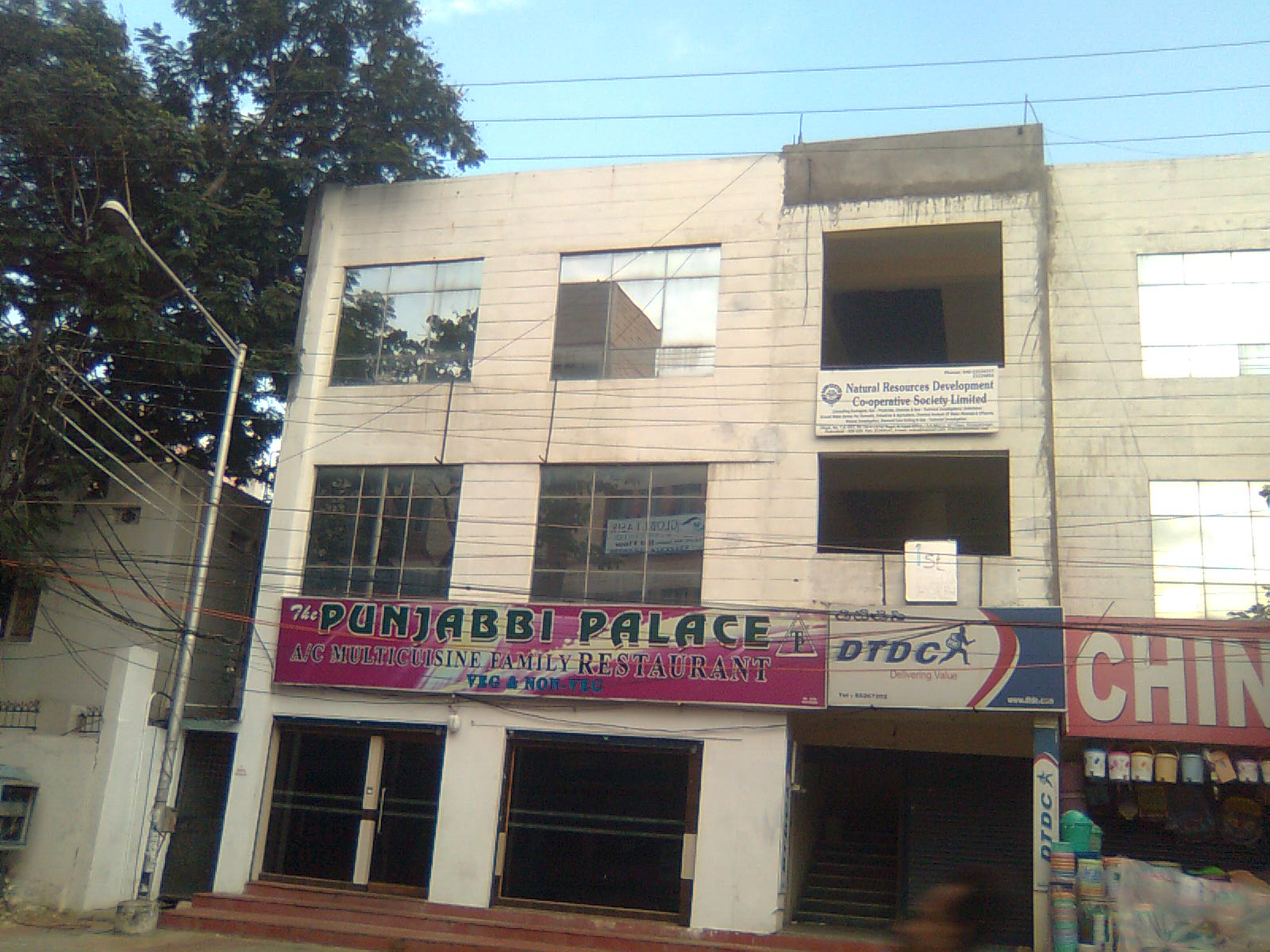
A restaurant name plate mentioning 'Veg & Non Veg', Andhra Pradesh, India

=== Display boards ===
- In India, most restaurants serving meat publicly and explicitly display the title 'non-vegetarian restaurant' or 'non-vegetarian hotel' (In India, the term hotel may colloquially refer to a restaurant or a hotel). This practice is intended to help strict, orthodox vegetarians who may want to avoid eating in such restaurants due to religious and casteist reasons or due to consciousness of the pain and sufferings that are inflicted on animals. Mahatma Gandhi's autobiography mentions an incident regarding his dilemma, as a vegetarian, whether it is appropriate to eat a vegetarian meal in a non-vegetarian restaurant.

== Popular dishes ==
=== Indian meat dishes ===
- Butter chicken, North Indian dish
- Tandoori chicken, dish from Indian subcontinent
- Mutton curry, dish of Indian subcontinent
- Rogan josh, Kashmiri dish
- Machher Jhol, Bengali dish
- Biriyani, Mughal dish
- Mutton Marag
- Ahuna Mutton, Bihari dish

=== Meat dishes originally of non-Indian descent ===
Some meat dishes originally of non-Indian descent, like certain European dishes called “Continental food”, are generally available on upscale Indian restaurant menu cards, whereas some Indian Chinese fusion cuisine offers chicken dishes, like chicken with chilli, garlic, ginger, jalfrezi, lemon, momo (food), varieties can be available in regular restaurants or as street food in big townships across India. Kabab, a middle Eastern dish, is also available in street shops and restaurants.

=== Egg based dishes ===
- Bread omelette
- Egg fried rice
- Egg noodles
- Egg puffs

== See also ==
- Carnism, a belief system presented by vegans as underpinning animal consumption
- Haram, a Muslim category of forbidden acts (and opposite of halal), including haram Food and intoxicants.
- Omnivores, animals that can survive from eating plants and meat

== Bibliography ==
- Tribal People of Central India: Problems and Prospects. India, K.K. Publications, 2022. Chapter 6, 7, 8
- Swami Vivekananda: The Feasting, Fasting Monk. India, Penguin Random House India Private Limited, 2022. (This book seem to have info related to 'non vegetarianism' in religious epics. (Page numbers not visible on Google books)
- Flavours Across Our Borders: Popular Global Veg & Non Veg Recipes. N.p., Notion Press, 2021.
- Animal Laws of India. India, Law & Justice Publishing Company, 2021. Editors: Maneka Gandhi, Ozair Husain, Raj Panjwani
- Hussain, Sadaf. Daastan-e-Dastarkhan: Stories and Recipes from Muslim Kitchens. India, Hachette India, 2019.
- Lahiri, Nayanjot. Time Pieces: A Whistle-stop Tour of Ancient India. India, Hachette India, 2018.
- Donner, Henrike. Domestic Goddesses: Maternity, Globalization and Middle-class Identity in Contemporary India. United Kingdom, Taylor & Francis, 2016. Chapter 5
- HUMAN RIGHTS LAW AND PRACTICE. India, Prentice Hall India Pvt., Limited, 2016. Page 250
- Callahan Jr., Edward J.. A Comparison of Markers of Iron Status Between Vegetarian and Non-vegetarian Female High School Cross Country Runners: Is Routine, Pre-season Screening Warranted?. United States, Central Washington University, 2015.
- Sen, Colleen Taylor. Feasts and Fasts: A History of Food in India. United Kingdom, Reaktion Books, 2014.
- Stuart, Tristram. The Bloodless Revolution: A Cultural History of Vegetarianism from 1600 to Modern Times. United Kingdom, W.W. Norton & Company, 2008.
- City, Society, and Planning: Society. India, Concept Publishing Company, 2007.
- Collingham, Lizzie. Curry: A Tale of Cooks and Conquerors. United Kingdom, Oxford University Press, 2007.
- Hussar, Karen M.. Vegetarian and Non-vegetarian Children's Judgments about Eating Meat. United States, Harvard Graduate School of Education, 2006.
- Cultural Geography, Form and Process: Essays in Honour of Prof. A.B. Mukerji. India, Concept Publishing Company, 2004.
- Murray, Shawn, et al. Meat-eating & Human Evolution. United Kingdom, Oxford University Press, 2001.
- Choudhary, Harveen. Non Vegetarian Low Calorie Recipes. India, Snab, 1999.
- The Eastern Anthropologist. India, Ethnographic and Folk Culture Society, 1999.
- Mehta, Nina. Adhunic Non Vegetarian. N.p., n.p, 1993.
- The Journal of the Anthropological Survey of India. India, The Survey, 1992.
- Dhadave, Mallikarjun Shankerappa, and Thakur, Rudranand. Slum and Social System. India, Archives Publishers, 1987.
- Uberoi, Pritam. Pritam Uberoi's Non Vegetarian Cookery: Recipes from India and Abroad Non Vegetarian Cookery : Recipes from India and Abroad. N.p., Sterling Publishers, 1981.
- Food, Ecology, and Culture: Readings in the Anthropology of Dietary Practices. United Kingdom, Gordon and Breach, 1980.
- Saraswati, Baidyanath, et al. The Sacred Complex of Kashi: A Microcosm of Indian Civilization. India, Concept, 1979. (Page 35)
- Deshpande, C. G.. On Intercaste Marriage: An Empirical Research Work. India, Uma Publication, 1972.
- Caste & Kinship in Central India. ~ Adrian C. Mayer N.p., University of California Press.1966
- Bulletin of the Anthropological Survey of India. India, Director, Anthropological Survey of India, Indian Museum, 1962.
- Dissertation Abstracts International: The humanities and social sciences. A. United States, University Microfilms, 2007. Page 2310
- The Comprehensive Guide For Da'wah In Mosques (Masjids). N.p., Bassam Bokhowa.
- Adams, Carol J.. Living Among Meat Eaters: The Vegetarian's Survival Handbook. United States, Lantern Books, 2008.
