= Victorian slide bracelet =

Nineteenth Century Women Fashion Accessory in England

The Victorian slide bracelet was a fashion accessory formerly worn by many women in nineteenth century England. Before the creation of the wrist watch, Victorian women wore their time piece on a neck chain that stayed in place with a decorative station that supported the watch (just under it). With a variety of these "stations" to wear with different outfits, they needed some use for all that jewelry after the wrist watch came into fashion.

The various pieces were lined up on a 6 or 7 inch (15-18 cm) double chain with little gold balls for spacing them called slide bracelets. Even old stick pin heads were mounted on "blank slides" to add into these bracelets.
