= Purse accessories =

Fashion accessories for handbags

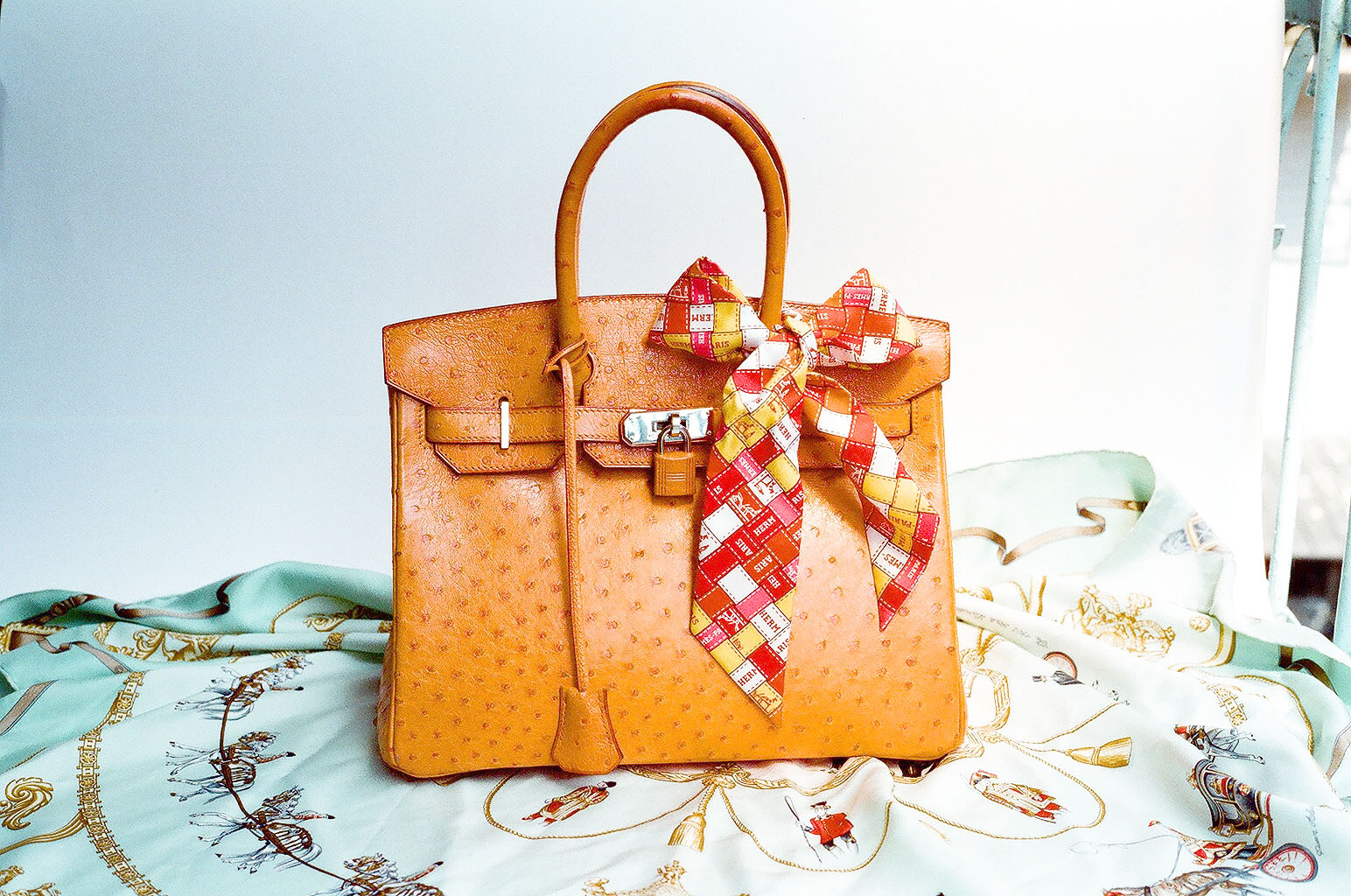
A Birkin bag with a bow attached as an accessory

Purse accessories are fashion accessories that are made specifically for handbags, to enhance their functionality or appearance.

== Purse rain cover ==
Purse rain covers, also widely known as Purse Raincoats, assist in waterproofing purses. They take the form of a waterproof cover that is worn on a purse to protect it from rain. The purse rain cover is commonly made out of waterproof fabrics such as PEVA or polyester. Some retailers offer them for free along with purchases of certain purses, such as Hermes Birkin handbags.

== Purse organizer ==
These assist in organizing, and ease finding objects inside purses, especially when they are overloaded. The purse organizer is inserted into the purse, and typically, has several pockets that can be used to group different items into separate groups, for example, electronics, make-up, and food and drinks pockets, thus, making it easier to find them. Purse organizers can be made out of plastic, although the more expensive ones are made out of leather.

== Fur and charms ==
Fur or charms can be added to purses, either as attachments, or as cosmetic covers.
