= Fashion design copyright =

Legal rights of fashion designs

Fashion design copyright refers to the web of domestic and international laws that protect unique clothing or apparel designs. The roots of fashion design copyright may be traced in Europe to as early as the 15th century.

As of 2016, in most countries (including the United States and the United Kingdom), fashion design does not have the same protection as other creative works (art, film, literature, etc.), because apparel (clothes, shoes, handbags, etc.) are classified as "functional items", except when copyright laws can be applied. This explains the success of the knockoff businesses to the detriment of established labels and emerging designers, the latter ones being especially damaged, because they rely on relatively few designs.

== History ==
French king Francis I gave out specific privileges related to the production of textiles. By 1711, in Lyon, illegalities were already being defined in regards to fashion materials, and in 1787, in England and Scotland fashion designers had fruitfully pushed their needs for protection into basic legislation. In 1876 Germany began protecting fashion patterns as well as models, and in 2002 European regulation on designs that were new and provided an aspect of fresh character or aesthetic were brought under protection. From 2004 to 2006 the "total production volume for clothing decreased by about 5% each year... [and by] 2006 the European union trade deficit for clothing was at 33.7 billion." These statistics show that while there are benefits of their advanced design legislation, the economic and external factors still hindered their industry growth in ways the U.S. can empathize with. As 2007 came to a close, WIPO, or the World Intellectual Property Organization, had registered twenty-nine international designs.

== Current regulation ==
The protection of fashion design varies greatly from one country to the other.

=== European Union ===
Unlike in the USA, when the laws regarding the clothing industry were created in Europe, the continent had a booming fashion industry that already started to reshape the clothing manufacturing industry.

In the European Union, the Creative Designs Directive and the European Designs Directive are in effect to protect new designs for three or five years. The European Union Intellectual Property Office are responsible for managing intellectual property in the EU.

=== United States ===
The US laws written in 1976 identify fashion as a manufacturing industry rather than a creative one, because fashion design had not reshaped the clothing manufacturing industry yet. The Digital Millennium Copyright Act (DMCA) of 1998 originally brought more limits to fashion design copyrighting, but a sui generis protection to the design of vessel hulls (DMCA-Title V: Vessel Hull Design Protection Act or VHDPA) was included to give more protection to some useful articles. The House of Representatives deemed fit to enable tighter fashion design copyrights through an extension of the VHDPA. There is no official design rights system, so brands and companies have to use design patents (a technical component of the design) and trademarks (names, slogans, logos) to "copyright" their products. Another option for highly-recognizable fashion designs is to register it as a trade dress with the United States Patent and Trademark Office (ex Hermès and the Birkin bag).

In the 2017 Supreme Court case. Star Athletica, LLC v. Varsity Brands, Inc., it was ruled that Fashion design can be covered by copyright.

...an artistic feature of the design of a useful article is eligible for copyright protection if the feature (1) can be perceived as a two- or three-dimensional work of art separate from the useful article and (2) would qualify as a protectable pictorial, graphic, or sculptural work either on its own or in some other medium if imagined separately from the useful article.

This decision enhanced the protection of unique fashion works, which are often knocked off by fast-fashion retailers who turn the vast grey area of fashion copyrights into a profit.

== Infringement cases ==
From 2009 to 2018, Gucci and Guess were in a copyrights feud over the use of a logo: Courts in the USA, China and Australia had ruled in favor of Gucci, while courts in France and Italy had ruled in favor of Guess.

In 2010, Alexander McQueen destroyed all its products containing the Hells Angels' trademarked winged death heads symbol after the motorcycle club threatened to sue.

In the 2012 case of Yves Saint Laurent v. Christian Louboutin, a court ruled that a brand could reuse Louboutin's signature red on shoes as long as the whole shoe is covered in red, because having only the soles in red was indeed a copyright violation.

In the UK, in the 2023 case of Adidas v. Thom Browne, a court ruled that Adidas' 3-stripe signature could be used by other brands.

== Digital fashion copyrights ==
The Hermès v. MetaBirkins case, the copyrights holder of the Birkin bag, the Hermès group, filed a lawsuit against the company MetaBirkins which had created an almost identical NFT bag sold $450 apiece. It was ruled in 2023 that NFTs were not protected by the First Amendment and had to respect copyrighted fashion designs.

== See also ==
- Design patent
