= Bhāva (Hinduism) =

Translations of भाव
- English: feeling, emotion, mood, becoming
- Sanskrit: भाव (IAST: bhāva)
- Pali: भाव (bhāva)
- Burmese: ဘာဝ (MLCTS: bàwa̰)
- Khmer: ភព (phob) or ភាវៈ (phiaveak)
- Mon: ဘာဝ ([həwɛ̀ʔ])
- Sinhala: භව or භවය
- Thai: ภวะ (RTGS: phawa) or ภาวะ (RTGS: phawa)

The Sanskrit word bhāva means an emotional frame or state of mind. Bhāva is closely linked with rasa, but they differ on which manifestation of emotion they refer to.

== Etymology ==
The term bhāva (भाव) comes from the verbal root bhu which means to exist or to pervade. Thus, bhava means generally a state of being, or a pervasive emotional state. It can also refer to a physical and mental state in which the physical and emotional cannot be separated. In most Indian languages, bhāva is translated as emotion/feeling.

== Natya Shastra ==
Sage Bharata describes two types of bhava in the Natya Shastra.

1. Sthayi bhava: the basic emotion
2. Vyabhichari bhava: the shifting emotions

== Samkhya ==
In Samkhya, there are eight bhavas, or psychological predispositions which are an inherent part of human nature.

1. virtue (dharma)
2. vice (adharma)
3. knowledge (jnana)
4. ignorance (ajnana)
5. non-attachment (viraga)
6. attachment (raga)
7. power (aisvarya)
8. impotence (anaisvarya)

== Yoga ==
When we are disrupted in any daily activities according to Sutra 1.2 of the Yoga Sutras of Patanjali: “Yoga Chitta Vritti Nirodha”. "Our highest duty Dharma is to ourselves to be in a balanced state of mind & to have faith". Our bhāvas, our emotional frame or state of mind, if negativity becomes our frame which makes it difficult for us to perform our duties (dharmic, societal or other), during our daily activities it is correct to see to it that we are in a positive state, to start to balance our mind by making use of techniques of yoga such as; simple asanas, pranayamas, and yogic meditation. Sutra 2.6 of the Yoga Sutras of Patanjali: “Drk-Darsanasaktyoh-Ekatmata-Iva-Asmita”. "Egoism, the seer identifies with the instruments of power of seeing, with sight and mind, that [to the egoist] is seeing". There is either success because work was done in a manner with certainty to guarantee succeeding or it is learning there was no “failure.". This learning is Jana Bhava or knowledge. Learning a different knowledge base of another people isn't a belonging of ours, only our learning truly is ours. Our learning isn't the same interpretation as another's learning, only minding our own learning can we feel sure that it belongs to us. My truth, their truth. Sutra 1.16 of the Yoga Sutras of Patanjali: “Tatparam Purusakhyateh Gunavaitrshnyam”. "Absolute knowledge of the soul of the universe (purusha) is obtained when the qualities of nature (Gunas) are understood and surpassed." We should learn to have a witness to every encounter, or our moments, like an “attitude.". This is having a little distance between events and ourselves, a little distance affords us surrendering to a higher reality, so that we are above our ego. We place our ego aside, reacting less and our thought is ahead of ego. Sutra 1.13 of the Yoga Sutras of Patanjali: “Tatra sthitau –yatnaḥ abhyāsaḥ”. "Abhyasa [or] practice is the effort to fix one's own self in a given attitude." When we practice and follow Dharma, Jana, and Vairagya then we have a self-reliance, positivity represented by confidence, will power and energy levels. "Practice makes a man perfect."

== In Ramakrishna Mission ==
According to Swami Shivananda, there are three kinds of bhava – sattvic, rajasic and tamasic. Which predominates in a person depends on their own nature, but sattvic bhava is Divine bhava or pure bhava (Suddha bhava). Swami Nikhilananda classifies bhava as follows:

- śāntabhāva, the calm, peaceful, gentle or saintly attitude
- dāsyabhāva, the attitude of devotion
- sakhyabhāva, the attitude of a friend
- vātsalyabhāva, the attitude of a mother towards her child
- madhurabhāva (or kantabhava), the attitude of a woman in love
- tanmayabhava, the attitude that the Lord is present everywhere

== In Gaudiya Vaishnavism ==
Rupa Goswamin's theory of bhakti, using Indian aesthetic theories, organizes bhāvas, the diverse modes of devotional worship, into a hierarchy. The five common bhāvas are:

1. awe and insignificance (śānta)
2. servitude (dāsya)
3. familial affection (vātsalya)
4. friendly affection (sākhya)
5. intimate, erotic love (mādhurya)
