= David J. Jenkins =

Canadian nutritionist (born 1942)

- Born: 20 July 1942 (age 84)
- Education: DPhil
- Alma mater: Oxford University
- Occupation: Nutritional scientist
- Scientific career
- Workplaces: University of Toronto

David J. A. Jenkins (born 20 July 1942) is a British university professor in the department of Nutritional Sciences at the University of Toronto Faculty of Medicine. He is an advocate and researcher of plant-based nutrition.

== Biography ==
Jenkins obtained a DPhil from Oxford University in 1975. He is a Fellow of the Royal College of Physicians and Surgeons of Canada.

Jenkins is credited with developing the concept of the glycemic index as a way of explaining the way in which dietary carbohydrate impacts blood sugar. His first paper on the subject appeared in the American Journal of Clinical Nutrition in 1981. Jenkins went on to author at least 15 more clinical studies on the effects of the glycemic index.

== Portfolio diet ==
More recently his focus has shifted to optimising serum lipids rather than glycemic index, culminating in a diet he calls the Portfolio diet that prioritises whole plant foods such as nuts, soy, healthy fats, plant sterols and soluble fibre. He has run clinically based dietary trials to elucidate the potential of the diet to prevent and treat chronic diseases such as cardiovascular disease.

== Selected publications ==
- Glycemic index of foods: a physiological basis for carbohydrate exchange (1981)
- Effect of a diet high in vegetables, fruit, and nuts on serum lipids (1997)
- Portfolio Dietary Pattern and Cardiovascular Disease: A Systematic Review and Meta-analysis of Controlled Trials (2018)
- Systematic review and meta-analysis examining the relationship between postprandial hypotension, cardiovascular events, and all-cause mortality (2022)
