= Portfolio diet =

Plant-based diet

The Portfolio Diet is a therapeutic plant-based diet created by British researcher David J. Jenkins in 2003 to lower blood cholesterol. The diet emphasizes using a portfolio of foods or food components that have been found to associate with cholesterol lowering to enhance this effect. Soluble fiber, soy protein, plant sterols, and nuts are the four essential components of Portfolio diet. The diet is low in saturated fat, high in fibre. Researchers have suggested that the Portfolio diet may be a useful addition to statin therapy to help people achieve their lipid targets.

== Background ==
Heart disease is the leading cause of death in the United States. Several risk factors have been identified as associated with cardiovascular disease. They include high blood pressure, high blood cholesterol, being overweight or obese, and smoking. The American Heart Association (AHA) and American College of Cardiology (ACC) suggested life style management to control risk factors in order to reduce cardiovascular risk. One of the strategies is to reduce dietary saturated fat, which should reduce low-density lipoprotein in the blood (LDL) which is considered “bad” blood cholesterol. If dietary and life style management proves ineffective on its own, medication is added, such as statin, to reduce blood cholesterol levels. Soy protein, nuts, viscous fibre, and plant sterols have been found to have a cholesterol lowering effect. The U.S. Food and Drug Administration has approved a health claim for these foods. David Jenkins believes that inclusion of all these foods in the diet is more effective at lowering cholesterol.

== Diet ==
A typical portfolio diet includes a daily intake of about 50 grams of nuts (such as almonds, peanuts and walnuts), 2 grams of plant sterols, 10-25 grams of soluble fiber (from sources such as oats, barley, and psyllium), and 50 grams of soy protein.

Example foods in the portfolio diet

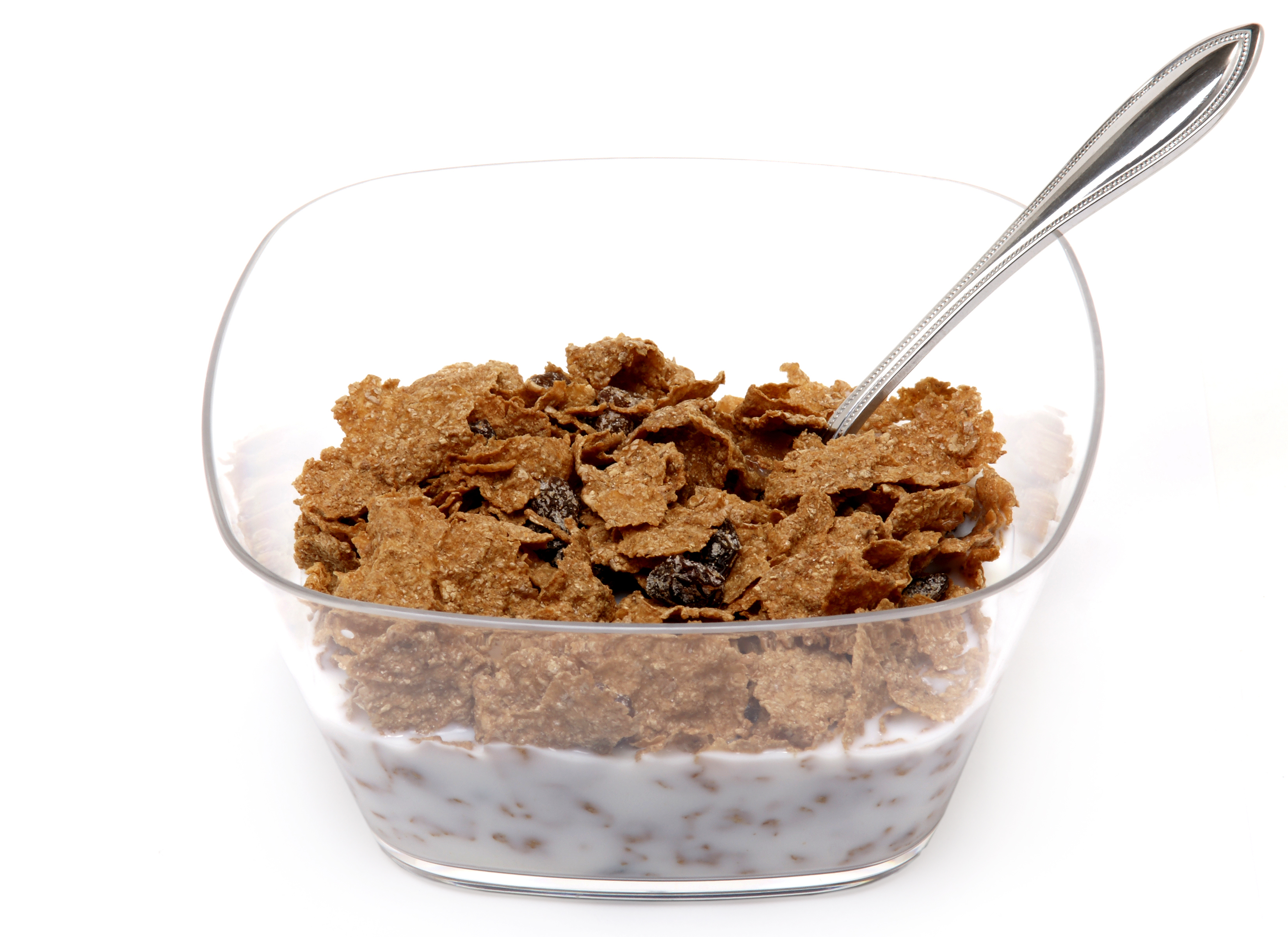
Oat bran cereal

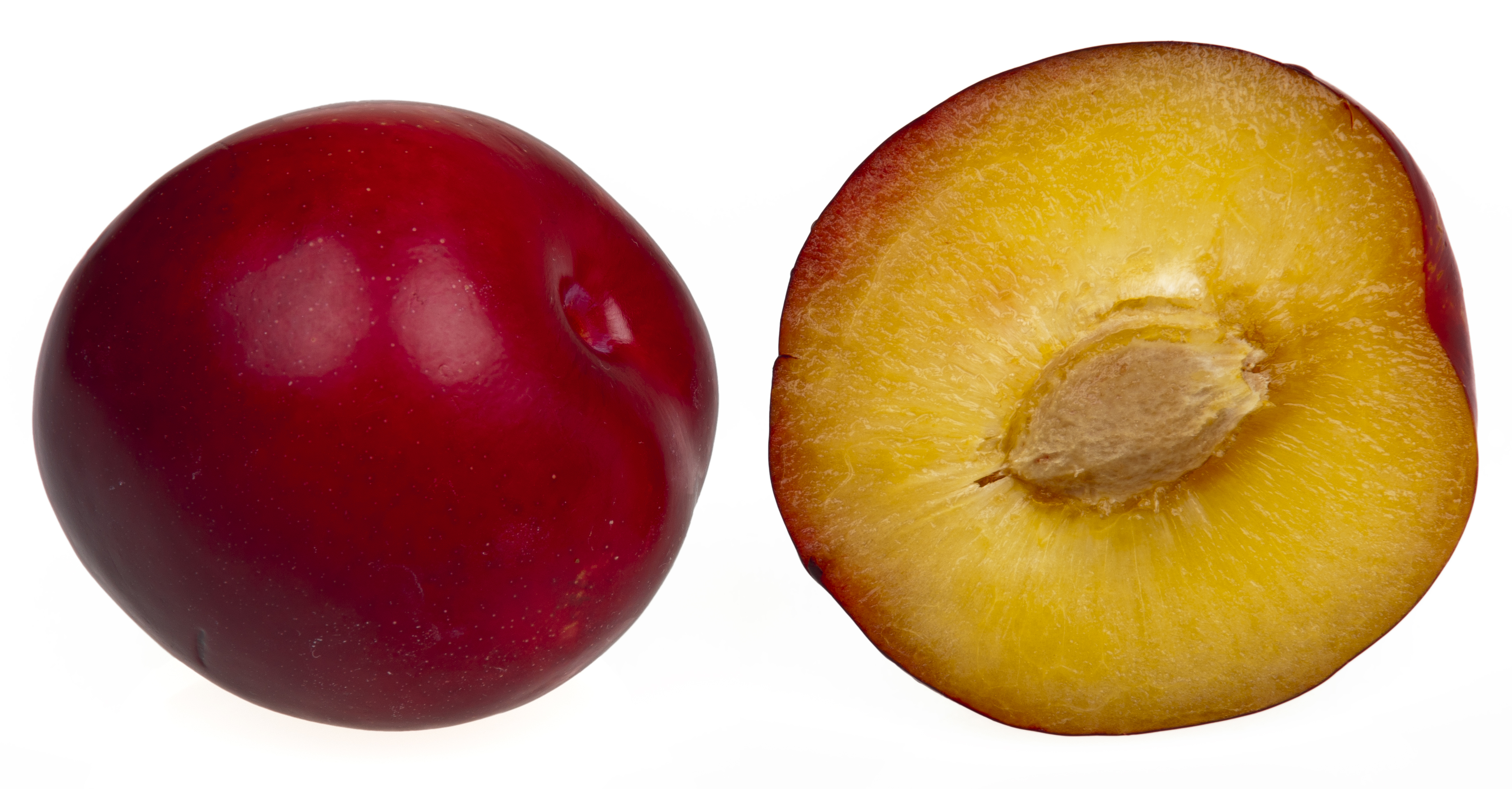
Plums

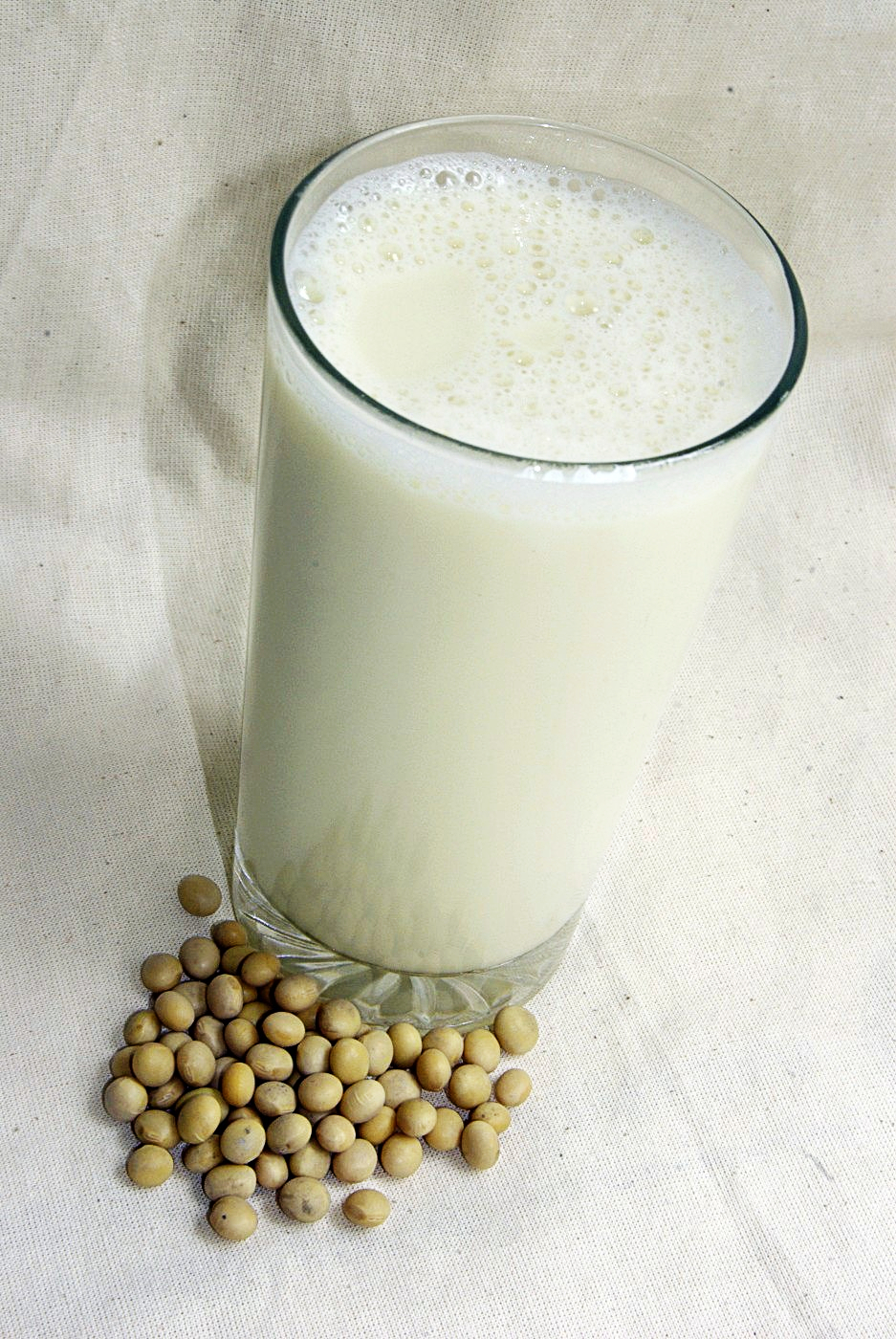
Soy milk

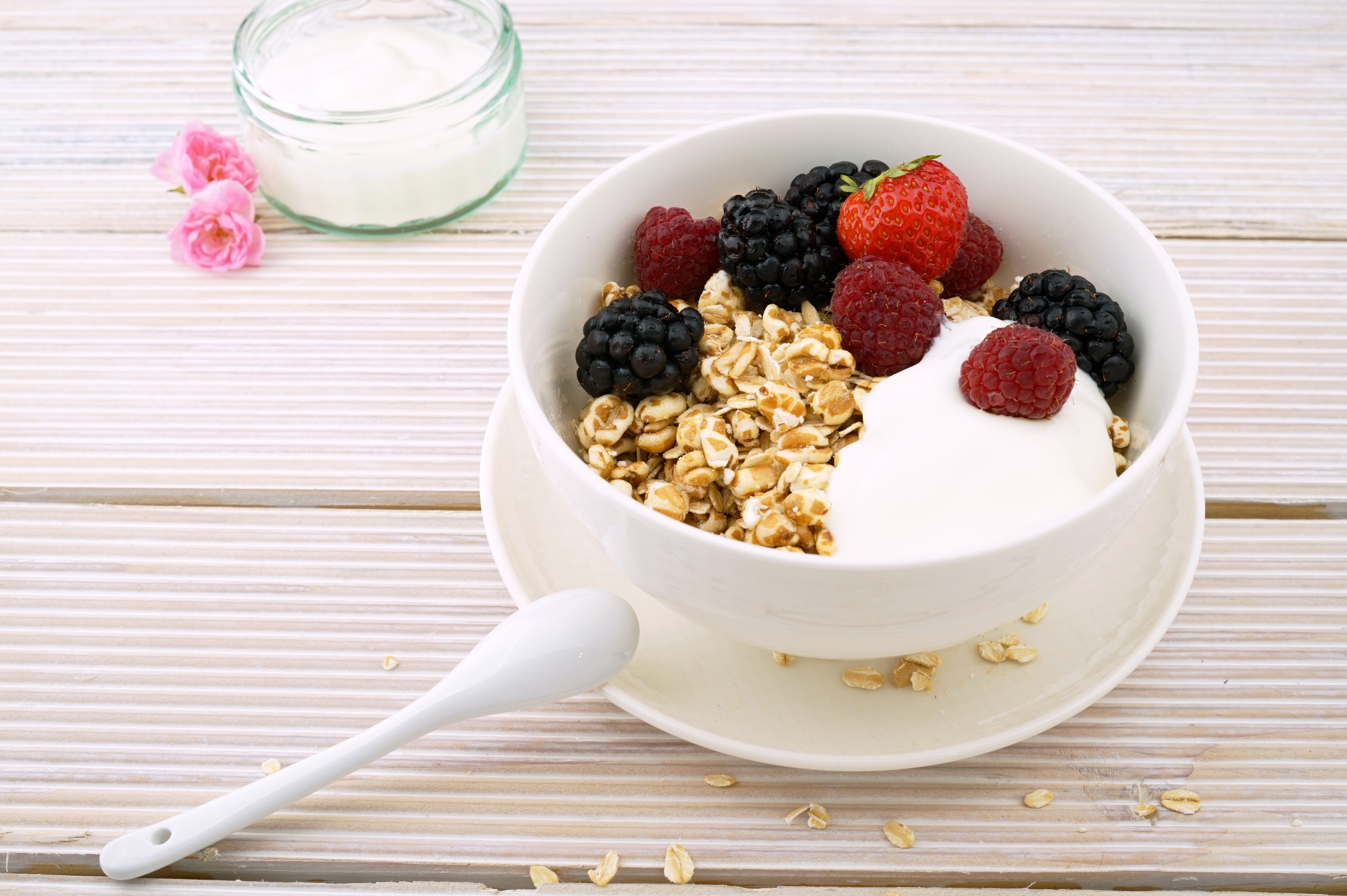
Granola with yogurt and fruit

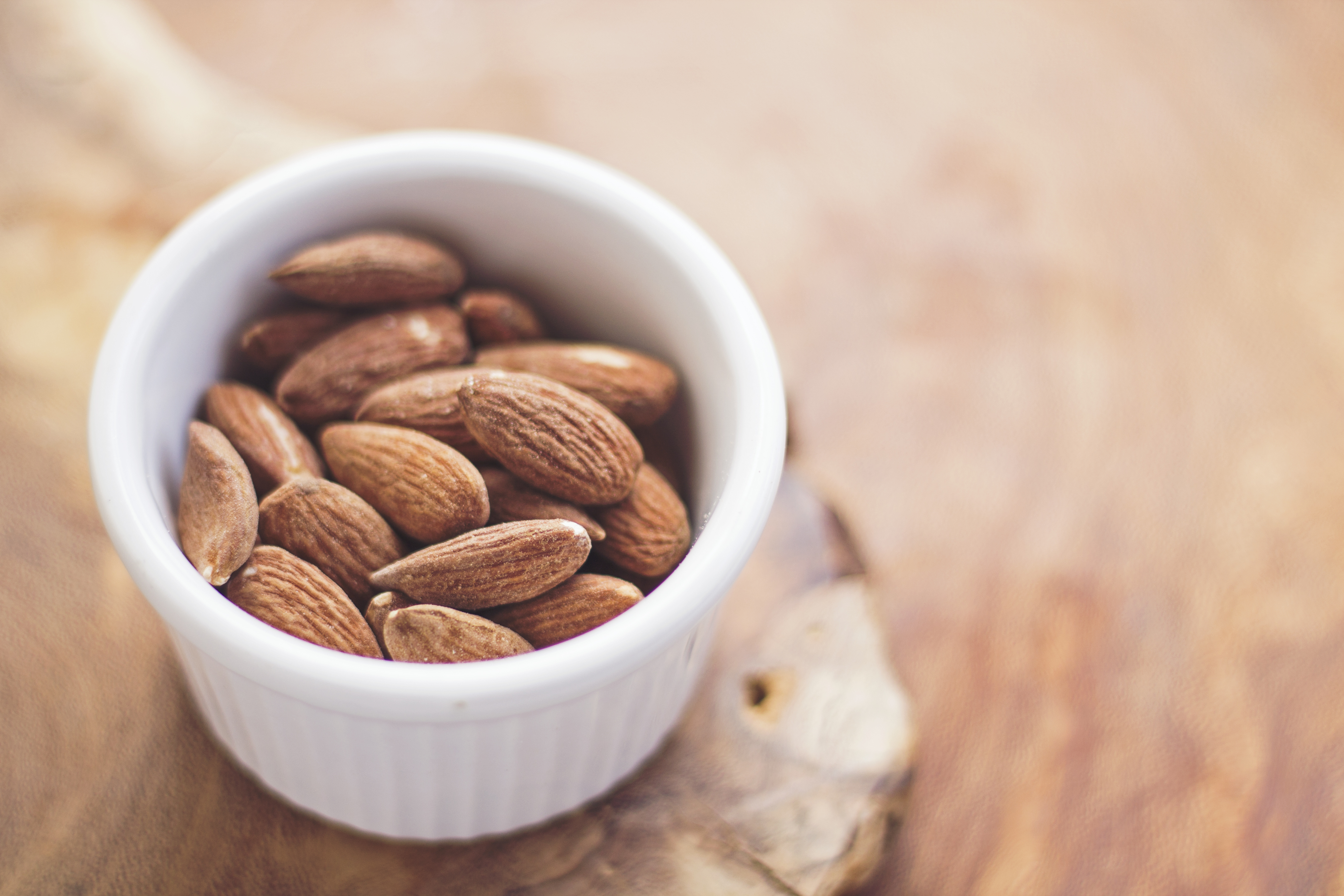
Almonds

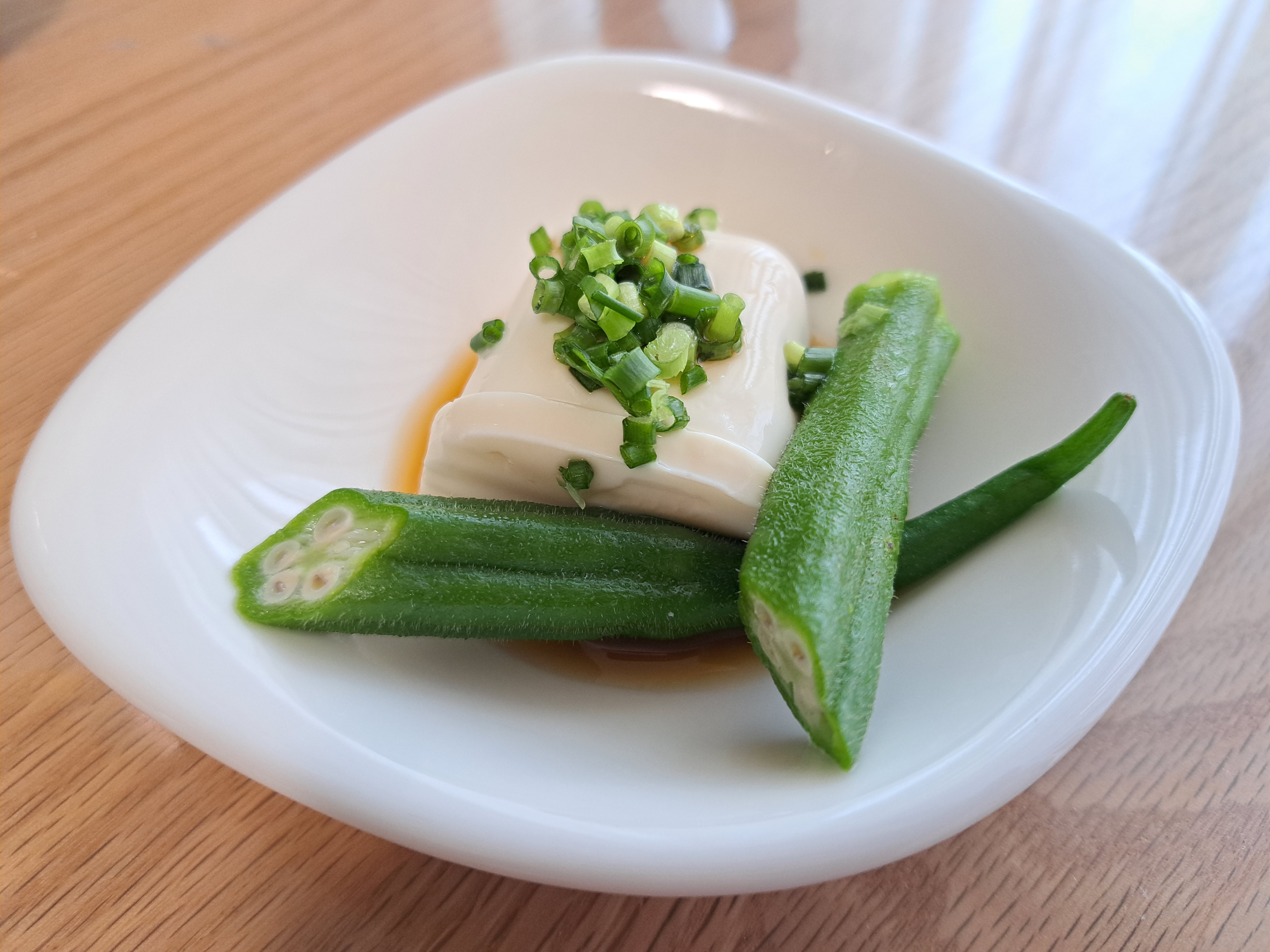
Tofu and okra

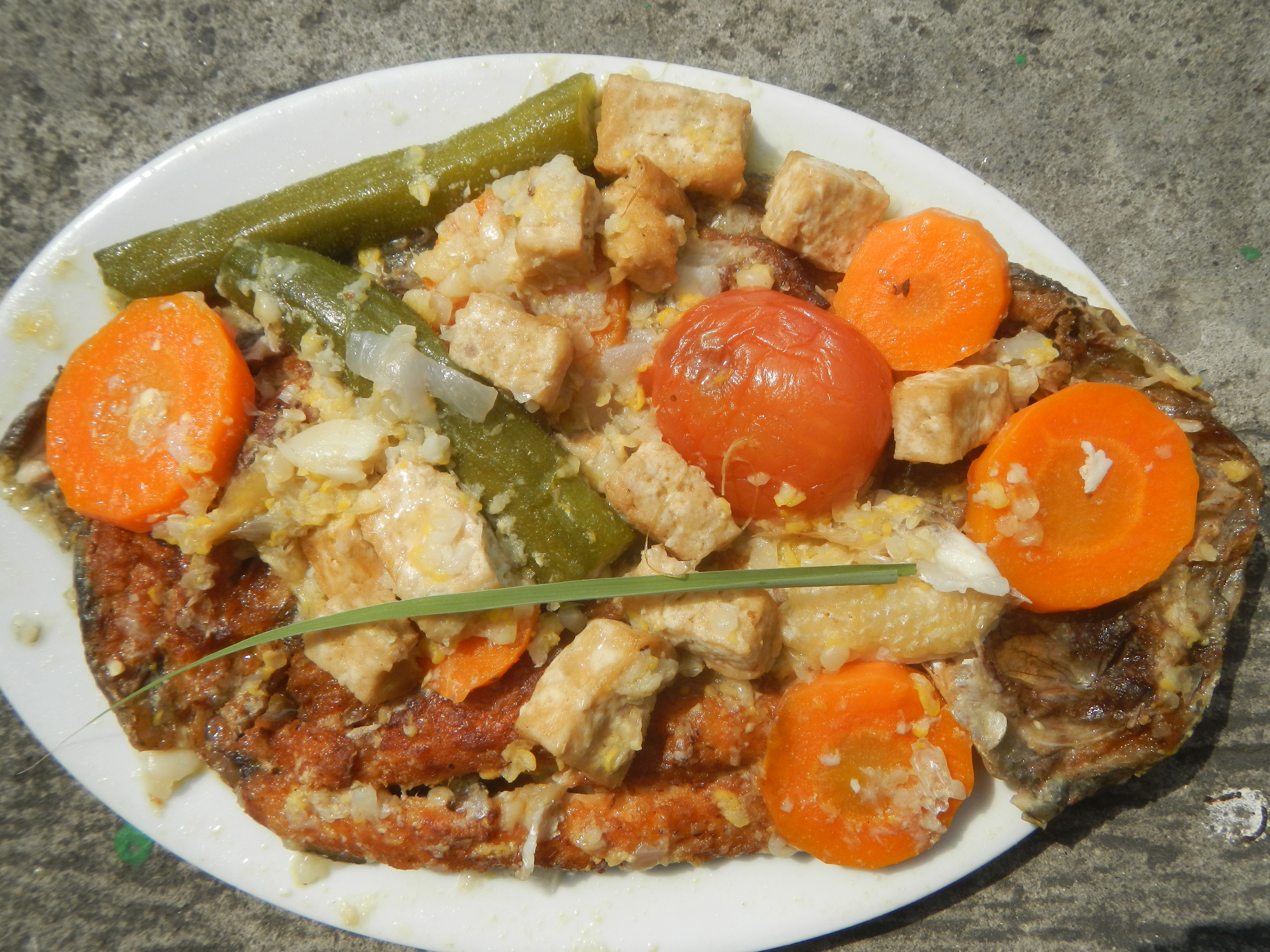
Vegetable stir-fry

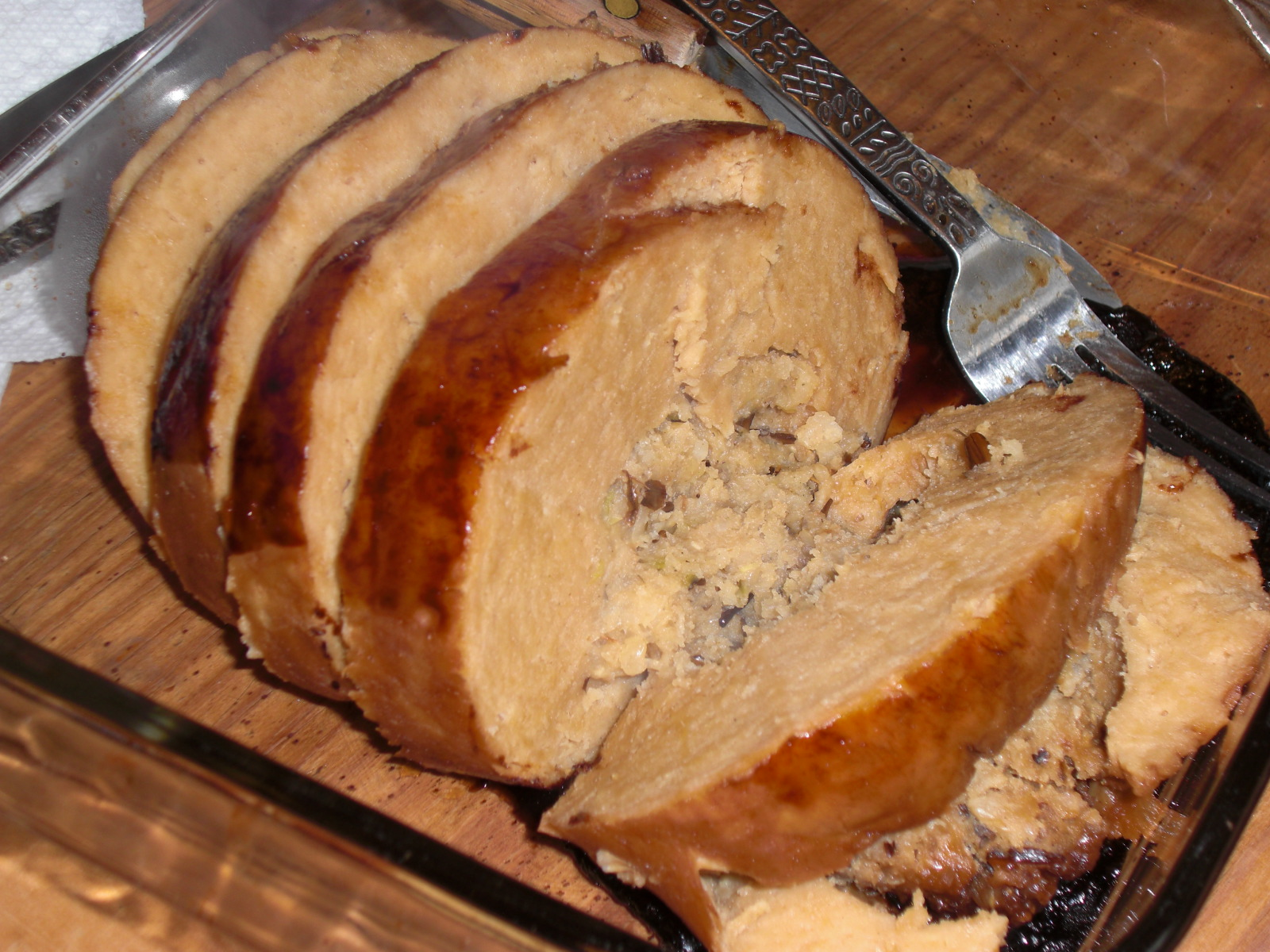
Soy-based meat alternatives

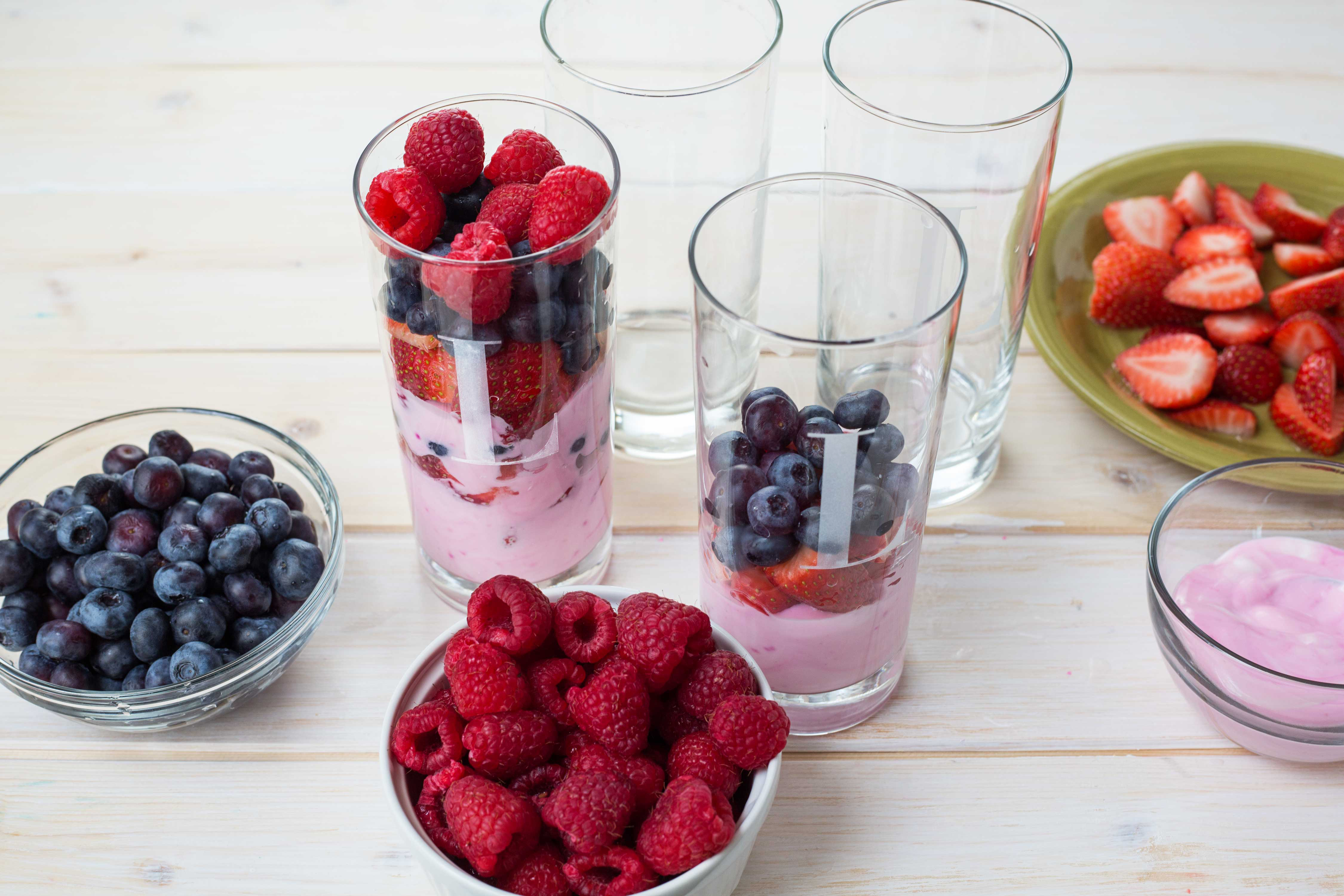
Yogurt with fruit

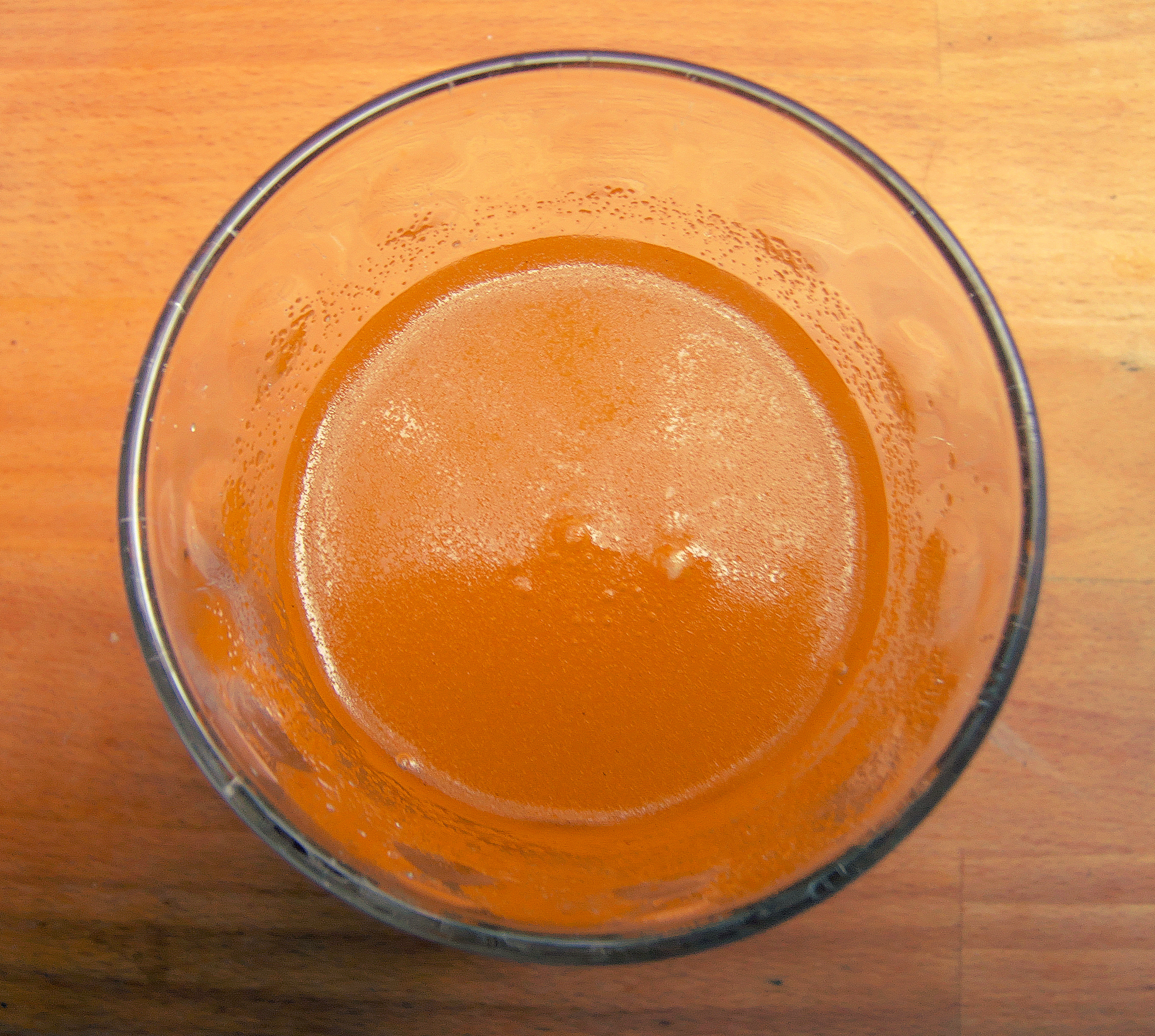
Psyllium fiber

== Health effects ==
There is high-quality evidence that the portfolio diet significantly reduces LDL-C and has positive effects on cardiometabolic risk factors.

== See also ==
- List of diets
