= List of vegan and plant-based media =

This list contains media that discuss the intersection of veganism and/or a plant-based diet with nutrition, health, ethics, and environmentalism/climate change.

== Books ==
Books
Title	Year	Author	Subject
Diet for a Small Planet	1971	Frances Moore Lappé	Ethics
Animal Liberation	1975	Peter Singer	Ethics
The Case for Animal Rights	1983	Tom Regan	Ethics
Diet for a New America	1987	John Robbins	Health
The Sexual Politics of Meat	1990	Carol J. Adams	Ethics
Animal Equality	2001	Joan Dunayer	Ethics
Speciesism	2004	Joan Dunayer	Ethics
The China Study	2005	T. Colin Campbell	Health
Eating Animals	2009	Jonathan Safran Foer	Ethics
Why We Love Dogs, Eat Pigs, and Wear Cows	2009	Melanie Joy	Ethics
Change of Heart	2011	Nick Cooney	Ethics
Bleating Hearts	2013	Mark Hawthorne (author)	Ethics
Eat Like You Care	2013	Gary L. Francione	Ethics
How Not to Die: Discover the Foods Scientifically Proven to Prevent and Reverse Disease	2015	Michael Greger	Health
The Lives of Animals	2016	J. M. Coetzee	Ethics
How to Create a Vegan World: A Pragmatic Approach	2017	Tobias Leenaert	Activism
The End of Animal Farming	2018	Jacy Reese Anthis, Tom Rivera	Ethics
This Is Vegan Propaganda: (And Other Lies the Meat Industry Tells You)	2023	Ed Winters	Activism
How to Argue With a Meat Eater (And Win Every Time)	2023	Ed Winters	Ethics

== Documentary films ==
Documentaries
Title	Year	Subject
The Animals Film	1981	Ethics
Diet for a New America	1991	Environment & Health
A Cow at My Table	1998	Ethics
Meet Your Meat	2002	Ethics
Peaceable Kingdom	2004	Ethics
Earthlings	2005	Ethics
A Sacred Duty	2007	Ethics
Peaceable Kingdom: The Journey Home	2009	Ethics
Fat, Sick and Nearly Dead	2010	Health
Planeat	2010	Health
Forks Over Knives	2011	Health
Vegucated	2011	Ethics
Live and Let Live	2013	Ethics
Speciesism: The Movie	2013	Ethics
Cowspiracy	2014	Environment
PlantPure Nation	2015	Health
Racing Extinction	2015	Environment
Carnage	2017	Ethics
What the Health	2017	Health
Eating Animals	2018	Ethics
Dominion	2018	Ethics
Eating You Alive	2018	Health
The Game Changers	2018	Health
Seaspiracy	2021	Environment
Eating Our Way to Extinction	2021	Environment
Milked	2021	Ethics and environment
Live to 100: Secrets of the Blue Zones (Dan Buettner)	2023	Health
Punk Rock Vegan Movie	2023	Ethics, Punk rock
Maa Ka Doodh (Mother's Milk)	2023	Ethics, Health & Environment
You Are What You Eat: A Twin Experiment	2024	Health
I Could Never Go Vegan	2024	Ethics, Health & Environment

== Misc ==
=== Cooking shows ===
- Pamela's Cooking with Love, (2025–present), hosted by Pamela Anderson.
- Unbelievably Vegan with Chef Charity (2024–present), hosted by Charity Morgan.
- The Vegan Good Life with Miyoko (2023–present), hosted by Miyoko Schinner
- Evolving Vegan (2023), TV Show, hosted by Mena Massoud
- It's CompliPlated (2023), Food Network, hosted by Tabitha Brown
- Living on the Veg, (2020) hosted by BOSH! chefs Henry Firth and Ian Theasby
- Vegan Mashup- Miyoko Schinner co-hosted the PBS cooking show for three seasons (2012-2016) with Toni Fiore and Terry Hope Romero.
- Post Punk Kitchen, (2003-2004), Brooklyn and Manhattan public access cable, a vegan cooking show hosted by Isa Chandra Moskowitz and Terry Hope Romero

=== Magazines and online publications ===
- Naked Food
- The Vegetarian Magazine
- VegNews
- Vegetarian Times
- Plant Based News

=== Newspaper/online columnists ===
Current

- Avery Yale Kamila, Portland Press Herald
- Hetty Lui McKinnon,The New York Times
- Meera Sodha, The Guardian
- Nisha Vora, The New York Times

Retired

- Carol Lee Flinders, syndicated vegetarian news column that shared the same title as her cookbook, “Laurel's Kitchen.”
- Joe Yonan, The Washington Post

=== Podcasts ===
- Our Hen House
- The Vegan Pod: A Podcast by The Vegan Society

=== Popular Media ===
- Viral conversation between Kaun Banega Crorepati 2025 Host Amitabh Bachchan and a contestant Siddharth Sharma regarding veganism.

== See also ==
- Bibliography of veganism and vegetarianism
