= Lamb and Lion =

The lamb and Lion (often referencing Isaiah 11:6) could refer to

- General heraldry: The lamb and lion
- The Lion, the Lamb, the Man, a 1914 American silent drama film
- Lamb & Lion Records, an American Christian record label founded in 1972
- Lions for Lambs, a 2007 American drama war film
- When Lambs Become Lions, a music album by Nothing Til Blood
- One Day as a Lion, rock power duo using ironic reference in their name of the 1930s Italian Fascist slogan, ""Better one day as a lion than a hundred days as a lamb."
- "Hosanna to God and the Lamb", a hymn which includes two variants of a verse reading in part, "How blessed the day when the lamb and the lion Shall lie down together in peace with a child."
- Coat of arms of the London Borough of Barnet
- 39 Blossom Street, a former pub in York, North Yorkshire, England

== See also ==
- Peaceable Kingdom (disambiguation)
- The Lion and the Lamb (disambiguation)
- Child shall lead them (disambiguation)
- The Wolf and the Lamb
- The Lamb, the Woman, the Wolf
