= Child will lead them (disambiguation) =

A little Child will lead them (from Isaiah 11:6) may refer to

- "A child will lead them", biblically inspired heraldry
- And a Little Child Shall Lead Them, an American silent short drama film
- "And the Children Shall Lead", a 1968 episode of the American science fiction television series, Star Trek

== See also ==
- Lamb and lion (disambiguation)
- Peaceable Kingdom
- Children's Crusade
