= Maa Ka Doodh =

Indian documentary

Maa Ka Doodh (Mother's Milk)
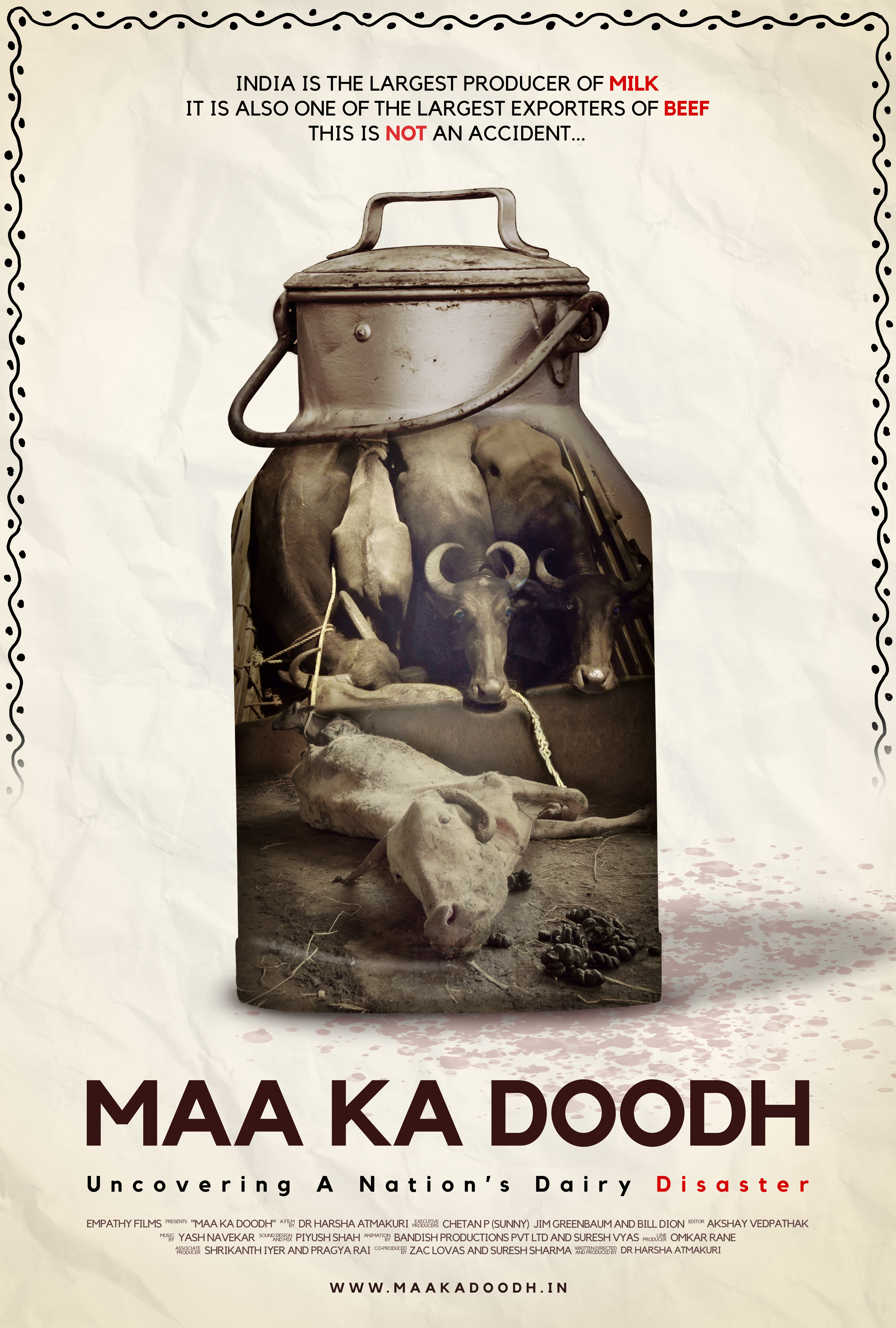
- Official Poster
- माँ का दूध
- Directed by: Dr Harsha Atmakuri
- Written by: Dr Harsha Atmakuri
- Produced by: Dr Harsha Atmakuri; Zac Lovas
- Cinematography: Shrikanth Iyer; Dr Harsha Atmakuri
- Edited by: Akshay Vedpathak
- Production companies: Empathy Films; Vegvoyages Foundation
- Release date: 26 January 2023
- Running time: 125 minutes
- Country: India
- Languages: English and Hindi

Maa Ka Doodh: Uncovering A Nation’s Dairy Disaster is an investigative feature-length documentary film that follows the journey of Dr. Harsha Atmakuri, who investigates to find out the untold stories behind the success of India’s White Revolution - The World’s Largest Dairy Production and Development Campaign. The documentary also explores the ethical, cultural, environmental, religious, economic, and political complexities that the consumption of dairy in India has created for millennia.

The film was made to be released on over-the-top streaming services. However, due to the sensitivity of the film, many studios declined to stream. So, the filmmakers have decided to make the movie available for free to watch on YouTube and Vimeo. It took 3 years for the filmmakers to complete the film.

The film is available in English, Hindi, Gujarati, Marathi, and Tamil languages, with additional Telugu dubbing on its way. The film is also available for streaming on Apple TV+, Prime Video, Plex , and Tubi in the US region.

== Plot ==
The film follows Dr. Harsha Atmakuri, who travels over 20,000 kilometres across the length and breadth of India, by road, for over two years, meeting people who are directly or indirectly associated with the dairy industry. During his extensive research, he conducted nearly 100 interviews that included eminent and notable people like Smt. Maneka Gandhi (Member of Parliament at the time of the interview and film's release), Sri Acharya Prashant (Spiritual Guru), Padma Shri awardee Smt. Sudevi Mataji, former IAS officers, IPS officers, Nari Shakti awardees Shakuntala Majumdar, Mini Vasudevan, Gauri Maulekhi, and Dr. Nandita Shah, as well as in-depth interviews with dairy farmers, gaushala administrators, gau rakshaks (cow protectors), and restaurant owners, among others.

In the course of the documentary, Dr. Harsha discovers how India became one of the largest exporters of beef in the world and identifies its direct link to the nation’s dairy industry. He uncovers the negative impacts of this industry on India’s bovine population, public health, environment, and culture. This film aims to bring forth to viewers sustainable, ethical, and compassionate solutions to the negative consequences associated with dairy and beef production in India.

== Director ==
Dr. Harsha Atmakuri is an Indian general physician turned documentarian. He learned about animal rights issues while working as a medical writer, and shortly after becoming vegan, he started participating in various animal rights awareness campaigns, such as public outreaches and lectures. To reach a broader audience, he began making short documentary videos and uploading them on social media platforms like Facebook and YouTube. In 2018, he decided to quit his job and become a full-time animal rights activist. He embarked on an investigative journey to explore India's dairy industry and uncover the potential link between India's position as the world's largest dairy producer and one of the largest exporters of beef. This is his first feature-length documentary film project.

== Production Companies ==
Empathy Films is a film and media production non-profit organisation with an underlying philosophy to produce impact films and other digital media-related projects to encourage and promote a cruelty-free, sustainable, and compassionate society. Maa Ka Doodh is its first production.

VegVoyages Foundation is a non-profit organization established with the belief that travel should be beneficial for both the people traveling and the communities they visit. Since the beginning, Vegan Travel Asia by VegVoyages has been incorporating social charitable activities, projects, and programs as a key part of their journeys in South Asia and Southeast Asia countries. Whether it is helping out at a local grassroots animal rescue or sanctuary, assisting with community education projects or community recycling programs, supporting local animal protection and conservation initiatives, providing school supplies, water filtration plants and desks to village schools, or serving up vegan lunches at children’s homes and emergency relief centers, producing impact documentary films and media, amongst many others.

== Awards ==
The film received four awards at the Jaipur International Film Festival:

- Best Documentary Film Award
- Best Director Award
- Best Documentary Feature Award
- Best Screenplay Award

Best Documentary Filmmaker of the Year Award from PETA India

== See also ==
- List of vegan and plant-based media
