= Nisha Vora =

American cookbook author and blogger

- Education: University of California, Berkeley; Harvard Law School
- Occupation: Vegan/Plant-based cookbook author
- Writing career
- Subject: Vegan/Plant-based cookbooks
- Notable works: Big Vegan Flavor: Techniques and 150 Recipes to Master Vegan Cooking (2024); The Vegan Instant Pot Cookbook: Wholesome, Indulgent Plant-Based Recipes (2019)

Nisha Vora is an American vegan/plant-based cookbook author and blogger. Her second cookbook, Big Vegan Flavor: Techniques and 150 Recipes to Master Vegan Cooking (2024) was nominated for the 2025 James Beard Award.

== Early life and education ==
Vora's parents emigrated from Mumbai, India to New Jersey in 1982. Her father, who is a physician, moved the family to Barstow, California, when he heard that there was a need for doctors there, and Vora grew up in Barstow.

At the age of 14, Vora began to teach herself how to cook by watching chefs such as Ina Garten and Alton Brown on the Food Network, spending time in the cookbook section of bookstores, and learning from her mother, who cooked Indian vegetarian cuisine.

Vora's family had given her three career paths to choose from (medicine, engineering, law), so she chose law. She continued to cook for her friends in college and law school, and received her degree in political science from the University of California, Berkeley in 2009 and her JD from Harvard Law School in 2012.

== Career ==
After law school, Vora worked in "a big law firm and a smaller nonprofit," but realized that she did not like the legal profession. She used cooking and eventually food blogging as a way to cope with the stress of legal work, and became involved in food photography and recipe development. Ultimately, she left her career as a lawyer in 2016 in order to focus fully on being a vegan food blogger, which was "inspired by documentaries about factory farming."

In 2017, Vora worked for a food startup while maintaining her social media presence. In 2018, she was contacted by Penguin Random House with an offer to turn recipes from her fledgling vegan cooking blog, "Rainbow Plant Life," into a book (The Vegan Instant Pot Cookbook: Wholesome, Indulgent Plant-Based Recipes, 2019). Vora does credit law school with the writing, research, and analytical skills needed for her current work saying that when she "was developing a chocolate chip recipe, I did a mountain of research on ingredient ratios in non-vegan chocolate chip cookies, the percentage of butter, the percentage of fat, the percentage of eggs, so that I could come up with a recipe that tastes just as delicious and is just as chewy and has crispy edges like a regular chocolate chip cookie. I bring this super analytical lens that I think comes from having that background as a law student and as a lawyer.”

In 2024, Gotham named her cooking channel as one of the "8 Vegetarian and Vegan Youtube Channels That Make Plant-Based Cooking Easy." In 2025, Vora joined NYT Cooking as a recipe developer.

=== The Vegan Instant Pot Cookbook (2019) ===
Forbes named her first cookbook, The Vegan Instant Pot Cookbook: Wholesome, Indulgent Plant-Based Recipes (2019) as one of the "Best Vegan Cookbooks" of 2019, Food & Wine called it one of "The 18 Best Vegan Cookbooks for Every Type of Meal" in 2023, Parade listed it as one of the "Best Vegan Cookbooks to Add to Your Collection Right Now" in 2019, and Good Housekeeping named it as one of the "14 Best Healthy Cookbooks, According to Cooking and Nutrition Experts" in 2023. VegNews listed The Vegan Instant Pot Cookbook as one of the "Top 100 Vegan Cookbooks of All Time" in 2024.

- The Vegan Instant Pot Cookbook: Wholesome, Indulgent Plant-Based Recipes. Avery, 2019. ISBN 978-0525540953.

=== Big Vegan Flavor (2024) ===
Her second cookbook, Big Vegan Flavor: Techniques and 150 Recipes to Master Vegan Cooking (2024) was nominated for the 2025 James Beard Award (Media: Vegetable-Focused Cooking). It was also #3 on The New York Times Best Seller list for the week of September 22, 2024. Kristin Montemarano states in Food & Wine that it is "filled with...essential flavor-building steps you should always be taking," while Washington Post Food and Dining Editor Joe Yonan suggests that it demonstrates how a plant-based diet "is a distinct cuisine with its own principles and strategies." In addition, New York (magazine) listed Big Vegan Flavor as one of "The Best Cookbooks to Gift This Year [2024]," Chowhound lists it as one of the "15 Best Vegetarian Cookbooks Of 2024," Civil Eats includes it in its "2024 Food and Farming Holiday Book Gift Guide," columnist Avery Yale Kamila listed it among "The year’s best vegan cookbooks" in the Portland Press Herald, and VegNews listed it as one of "The Best Vegan Cookbooks of 2024."

- Big Vegan Flavor: Techniques and 150 Recipes to Master Vegan Cooking. Avery, 2024. ISBN 978-0593328934.

== Articles ==
- "These Vegan Thanksgiving Recipes Will Wow Everyone at the Table," New York Times Cooking, October 13, 2026.

== See also ==
- List of vegan and plant-based media
