= BOSH! (book) =

2018 cookbook

- Front cover
- Author: Henry Firth and Ian Theasby
- Subject: Cookbook; Veganism
- Publisher: HarperCollins
- Publication date: 19 April 2018
- Pages: 288
- ISBN: 9780008262907

BOSH!: Simple Recipes. Amazing Food. All Plants. is a 2018 cookbook by the British duo of the same name, known for their vegan recipes.

== Background ==
Henry Firth and Ian Theasby started the Facebook channel "BOSH!" in June 2016, where they published videos of vegan cookery. The two were school friends from Sheffield; they became vegan in the mid-2010s. Their videos, posted across social media each weekday, were receiving 25 million views on Facebook per month at the time of the book's release. The duo were inspired by Jamie Oliver and own many of his cookbooks. Firth and Theasby said that their aim with the book was to "put more plants on more plates, whether that’s one day a week or seven days a week". They wanted the recipes to be "easy" and "fuss-free".

== Synopsis ==
BOSH! features 140 vegan recipes. Meals include carbonara, chili, mushroom pie and an alternative to fish and chips; there are also desserts such as brownies and churros, as well as cocktails. Some are grouped by theme, such as "The Big Chinese Takeout", "Spanish Spread" and "A Tex-Mex Style Fiesta". The book is illustrated and nutritional information is provided in a section at the end. Instructions are based on a convection oven.

== Publication and sales ==
It was published by HarperCollins' imprint HQ in the UK, and its imprint William Morrow and Company in the US. The Bookseller reported that eight publishers participated in an auction for the book rights, and the deal made with Firth and Theasby was between £100,000 and £1 million. The deal was for two books, the second of which – BISH BASH BOSH!: Amazing flavours. Any meal. All plants. – was published in April 2019. HQ employee Joanna Rose commented that visual media such as billboards and social media videos were scheduled mostly between 3 p.m. and 6 p.m., when consumers would be most hungry.

UK sales reached 350,000 copies in 2018. It was the best-selling vegan cookbook on Nielsen Bookscan and was number one on The Times's Bestsellers for four weeks. By 2020, it was one of the 50 most-sold cookbooks in the UK. Firth and Theasby published several further cookbooks in the following years, along with the book How to Live Vegan, reaching a million sales of their books by January 2022.

== Reception ==
The book won a 2019 British Book Awards in the category "Non-Fiction: Lifestyle Book of the Year". Publishers HQ won the Marketing Strategy of the Year Award. It was awarded Best Vegan Cookbook at the PETA Vegan Food Awards in 2018. VegNews listed it as one of the "Top 100 Vegan Cookbooks of All Time" in 2024.

For Library Journal, Lisa Campbell recommended the book as "an excellent choice for established and aspiring vegans who crave meaty flavors and substantial recipes".
