= Live and Let Live =

Live and Let Live may refer to:

== Film ==
- Live and Let Live (2013 film), a 2013 documentary film about veganism
- Live and Let Live (1921 film), a 1921 silent American melodrama film

== Music ==
- "Live and Let Live", a song by Love from their 1967 album Forever Changes
- Live and Let Live!, a 1988 album by Bobby King and Terry Evans
- "Live and Let Live", a song by Souls of Mischief from their 1993 album 93 'til Infinity
- "Live and Let Live" (Peter Gabriel song), 2023
- Live and Let Live, an album by South Korean singer Shin Hye-sung
- Live and Let Live (Twelfth Night album), 1984
- Live and Let Live (10cc album), 1977

== Other uses ==
- Origin or literary use: In Wallenstein's Camp, the 1798 first part of Friedrich Schiller's "Wallenstein" trilogy, it is said of the imperial general Tilly: "His saying was: live and let live."
- Live and let live (World War I), a system of conflict avoidance used in trench warfare in World War I
- Live and Let Live, an 1837 novel by Catharine Sedgwick

== See also ==
- Live and Let Die (disambiguation)
