= Jasmin Singer =

American animal rights activist

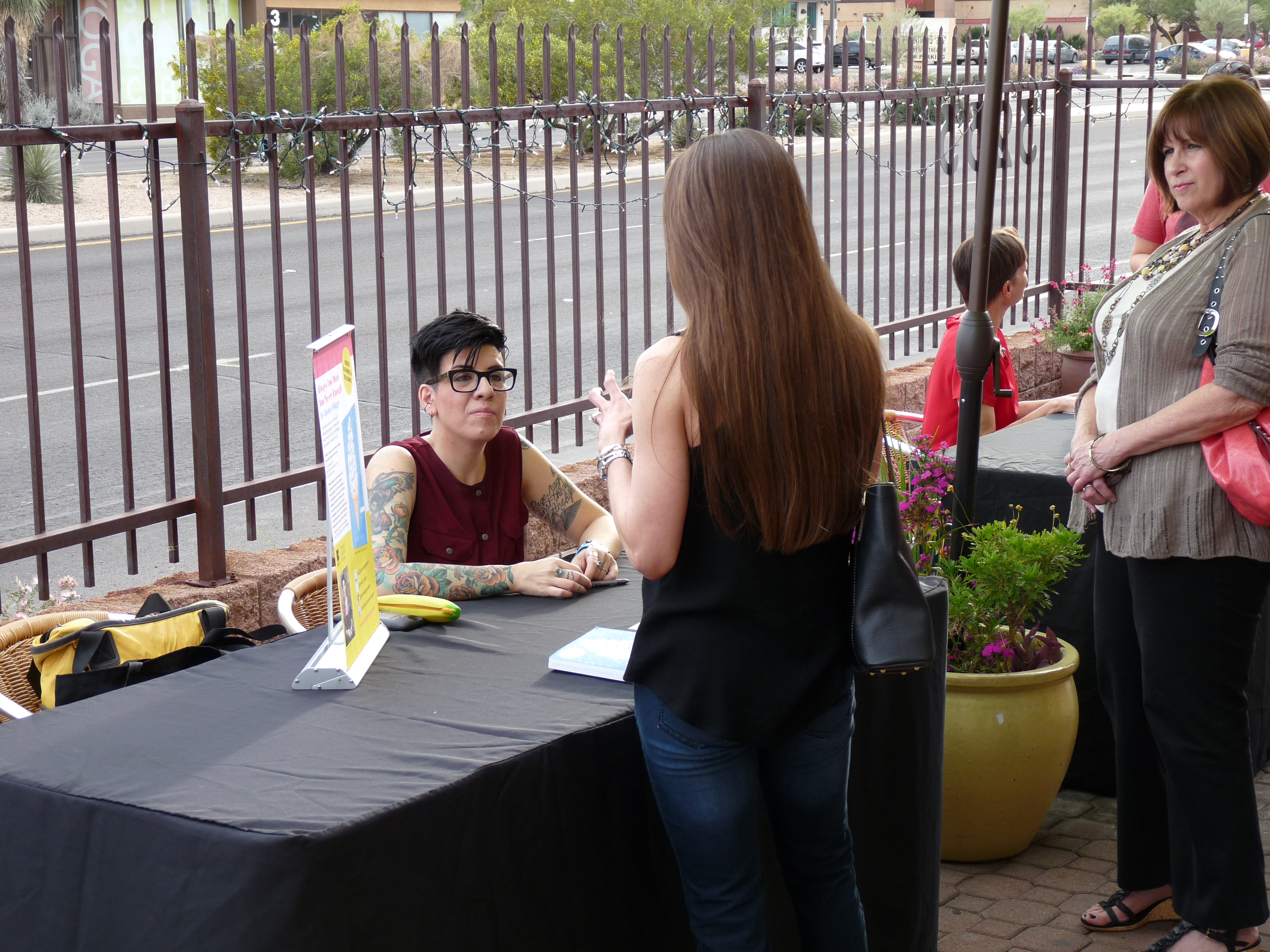
Jasmin Singer signing books in 2016

Jasmin Singer (born October 30, 1979) is an American animal rights activist, author and actress.

Since 2022, she has been the host of Weekend Edition for WXXI, Rochester, NY's NPR member station. She is the co-founder of the non-profit organization and podcast Our Hen House, serves as editor-at-large of VegNews, and is the former Vice President of Editorial at Kinder Beauty. She also supports LGBTQ+ and overlapping social justice issues.

Singer has appeared on The Dr. Oz Show, Vegucated, The Ghosts in Our Machine, HuffPost Live, and Unchained with Jane Velez-Mitchell.

On May 20, 2017, she gave the TED talk "Compassion Unlocks Identity" in Asbury Park, New Jersey. In 2014, Singer was named one of the "40 People Under 40 to Teach Us About Each Other" by the magazine The Advocate.

== Biography ==
Jasmin Singer was born on October 30, 1979. She grew up in Edison, New Jersey. From childhood to adulthood, Singer struggled with weight problems. She studied at Pace University in New York, where she earned an acting degree.

At age nineteen, she became vegetarian. After graduating, Singer toured with the AIDS-awareness theater company Nitestar as an educator. Later, she obtained a master's degree in experiential health and healing from The Graduate Institute, and a holistic health certification from the Institute for Integrative Nutrition.

At twenty-four years old, Singer turned to veganism after watching a film about factory farming. She incorporated animal rights into her LGBTQ+ and feminist activism. After going vegan, Singer volunteered at PETA's headquarters in Norfolk, Virginia for a week, and began steering her career toward animal rights activism.

Shortly afterward, she started writing articles on the subject and became the Campaigns Manager for Farm Sanctuary. Singer was a freelance writer for VegNews magazine for ten years and since 2016 to 2018, was the magazine and digital brand's senior editor.

== Writing ==
Singer has written for VegNews, Huffington Post, Sentient Media, and mindbodygreen. She has proposed the use of personal narrative to affect social change, believing that the "animal rights movement has barely even begun to scratch that surface", unlike other social justice movements. Her articles on VegNews have focused on "fierce women".

=== Always Too Much and Never Enough ===
On February 2, 2016, Jasmin Singer released her memoir Always Too Much and Never Enough through Penguin Random House. It tells her struggles with disordered eating, society's mistreatment of overweight people and how she lost almost 100 pounds after starting to look after herself. It also touches on her experiences of having a difficult childhood, being bullied while growing up, animal rights and her sexuality.

The book was conceived after she was approached by publishers following an article she wrote for MindBodyGreen which reached over 100,000 shares in a day. Amy Wilson, reviewing for the publishers's house organ, Everyday eBook, described it as a "finely constructed book" and a "fresh and breezy take on memoir", which "manages the delicate feat of sharing her personal journey with an activist's verve that never tips over into the preachy." Merryn Johns at Curve called it "an honest, beautifully written account of her journey". Nathan Runkle opined that "Her witty, yet deeply insightful and educated commentary is not only refreshing, but also provocative." In May 2019, it as included among "The 7 Most Inspiring Books About Weight Loss" by Everyday Health.

=== The VegNews Guide to Being a Fabulous Vegan ===
Published in December 2020 by Hachette, The VegNews Guide to Being a Fabulous Vegan: Look Good, Feel Good, & Do Good in 30 Days is Singer's second book and first in partnership with VegNews. The book breaks down myths and tips about going vegan; discusses topics including sex, nutrition, dating, and fitness; and includes 30 plant-based recipes.

== Our Hen House ==
In January 2010, Singer and Mariann Sullivan, an animal law professor at Columbia Law School, co-founded the non-profit organization Our Hen House, which produces multimedia content aimed at helping people to create change for animals. Its website includes interviews, podcasts, reviews, food advice and networking tips, divided into categories such as law, academia and arts. Its best known medium is the Our Hen House podcast, co-hosted by Singer and Sullivan.

Our Hen House also provides the Animal Law podcast, hosted by Mariann Sullivan.The podcast has been recognized as a Webby Awards' official honoree in 2013, 2015, 2017, and 2020. In 2015, GO magazine chose Our Hen House as one of the most important ecopreneurships of the year.

== Acting ==
=== Filmography ===
- Nothing to Fear, student film
- Vegucated, 2011
- The Ghosts in Our Machine, 2013
- Almost.... Not Quite: Together Apart, 2020 TV Series
- The Bra Mitzvah, 2020 (short film)
- Who Killed Me?, 2022 (short film)

=== Theater ===
- Exhibit This: The Museum Comedies, Midtown Fringe Festival, NYC
- Laguna, Producer's Club, NYC
- The James Dean Story, Circle Playhouse, NJ
- End of the Rainbow, JCC CenterStage, NY

== See also ==
- List of vegan and plant-based media
