= Richa Hingle =

Indian vegan cookbook author

- Occupation: Vegan cookbook author
- Subject: Vegan/plant-based cookbooks
- Notable works: Vegan Richa's Indian Kitchen: Traditional and Creative Recipes for the Home Cook. (2015); Vegan Richa's Instant Pot™ Cookbook: 150 Plant-based Recipes from Indian Cuisine and Beyond. Hachette Book Group, 2022.

Richa Hingle is an Indian vegan/plant-based cookbook author, known as the blogger Vegan Richa.

== Early life ==
Hingle grew up in India.

== Career ==
She was forced to give up her career as a software engineer after a craniotomy in 2006. During the recovery period, she adopted a rescue dog and became involved in animal welfare. She also began to blog about baking and learned about veganism.

Hingle started her blog "Vegan Richa" in 2009, and fully shifted to a vegan diet around 2010, motivated by her rescue experience.

== Awards and reception ==
Vegetarian Times listed her first cookbook, Vegan Richa's Indian Kitchen: Traditional and Creative Recipes for the Home Cook (2015), as one of their "favorite" cookbooks of 2015, PETA listed it as one of "7 Must-Have Vegan Cookbooks" in 2016, Good Housekeeping named it one of the "15 best meat-free cookbooks in 2019," and Women's Health (magazine) refers to it as one of the "20 Best Vegan Cookbooks Of 2022 For Every Type Of Cuisine And Interest." VegNews named it one of the "Top 100 Vegan Cookbooks of All Time," in 2024.

VegNews listed Hingle as one of the "37 Creative Chefs Crafting the Future of Vegan Food" in 2023, and gave her a Bloggy Award in 2016.

In 2022, Vegan Richa's Instant Pot™ Cookbook: 150 Plant-based Recipes from Indian Cuisine and Beyond was nominated for an IVFF award.

== Personal life ==
Hingle lives in Seattle, Washington with her husband.

== Books ==
- Vegan Richa's Instant Pot™ Cookbook: 150 Plant-based Recipes from Indian Cuisine and Beyond. Hachette Book Group, 2022. ISBN 978-0306875038.
- Vegan Richa's Everyday Kitchen: Epic Anytime Recipes with a World of Flavor. Vegan Heritage Press, 2017. ISBN 978-1941252390.
- Vegan Richa's Indian Kitchen: Traditional and Creative Recipes for the Home Cook. Vegan Heritage Press, 2015. ISBN 978-1941252093.
