= Living on the Veg =

Television show

- Created by: Henry Firth and Ian Theasby
- Presented by: Henry Firth and Ian Theasby
- Country of origin: United Kingdom
- Original language: English
- No. of series: 1
- No. of episodes: 10

Production
- Production company: Rock Oyster Media

Original release
- Network: ITV
- Release: 12 January – 15 March 2020

Living on the Veg is a British vegan cookery programme that first aired in 2020 on ITV. It is hosted by the cookery writers and bloggers Henry Firth and Ian Theasby, a duo known as BOSH!. Each episode features a series of recipes cooked by Firth and Theasby, and a guest who talks with the hosts about food and their work. It is produced by produced by Rock Oyster Media and distributed by Cineflix Rights. Living on the Veg is ITV's first vegan cooking programme.

== Production ==
Firth and Theasby met at High Storrs School in Sheffield as children and became friends. The pair became vegan in 2015; Theasby first, with Firth following after seeing Cowspiracy. They then formed BOSH!, producing vegan cookery videos for YouTube and social media, garnering over a billion views. They authored a series of successful cookery books, as well as How to Live Vegan, a book about living as a vegan in a non-vegan world. As early as 2017, Firth and Theasby hoped to host the first vegan cookery show.

They pitched the idea to a range of production companies, but had no initial success. They were then approached by Plymouth-based production company Rock Oyster Media, who asked if the pair had considered producing a vegan cookery programme.

In producing Living on the Veg, Firth and Theasby hoped to appeal beyond the vegan market, to flexitarian and even meat-eating audiences.

The first episode, which was aired on 12 January 2020, featured sponsorship from the supermarket Waitrose, along with ITV's other Sunday morning cookery programming. This led to a backlash from vegans, as the Waitrose adverts featured non-vegan products and footage of farmed animals. Spokespersons from The Vegan Society and PETA argued that Waitrose could have used the adverts to showcase their plant-based products. Waitrose apologised, explaining that they were not aware of the content of Living on the Veg in advance, and explained that they were speaking to ITV to "make sure that all foods featured in the future are more matched to the topics in the show".

== Format ==
The first series was made up of ten one-hour episodes, airing weekly on Sunday mornings. On the programme, Firth and Theasby produce a series of vegan foods, for a range of meals, including "pizzas, burgers, curries, pies, big breakfasts, [and] decadent desserts". They aim to walk viewers "through a new weekly menu every episode". Every episode features a guest. The tone is light-hearted, featuring back-and-forth between Firth and Theasby.

== Episodes ==
Episode number	First broadcast date	Recipes	Guest
1	12 January 2020	Roast dinner; avocado snack hacks; curry house jalfrezi; English ploughman's sandwich; sticky toffee pudding	Sadie Frost
2	19 January 2020	Full English breakfast; lasagne; burgers; nut-based snack hacks; salted caramel apple crumble	Alex Beresford
3	26 January 2020	Paella; Texas BBQ pizza; beetroot ravioli with slaw (by Day Radley); houmous snack hacks; Victoria sponge	Day Radley
4	2 February 2020	Party poppers with Asian BBQ sauce; Barcelona breakfast burrito and Green Goddess smoothie; mushroom Wellington; aubergine katsu; banana bread doughnuts	Prue Leith
5	9 February 2020	Thai jackfruit "fishcakes"; piri piri chorizo bake; faux gras pate (by Alexis Gauthier); smoothie snack hacks; mini banoffee meringues	Alexis Gauthier
6	16 February 2020	Shepherd's pie; cookies; roasted vegetable farinata (by Sal Dhalla); sushi; Bakewell tart and custard	Sal Dhalla
7	23 February 2020	Braised jackfruit chilli; Camembert Hedgehog; Korean carrot and sesame pancakes (by Anna Jones); mezze layer cake; aquafaba chocolate mousse	Anna Jones
8	1 March 2020	Vegan crispy aromatic duck; cauliflower wings and ranch dressing; miso-glazed aubergine (by Luke Robinson); vegetable stew; pain au chocolate cake	Luke Robinson
9	8 March 2020	Pastaball marinara; French toast; BBQ glazed ribs (by Meriel Armitage); crisy chilli tofu; peanut butter and jelly brownies	Meriel Armitage
10	15 March 2020	Seaside pie; chilli and nachos; harissa hotpot (by Rachel Ama); burrito cake; New York baked cheesecake	Rachel Ama

== See also ==
- List of vegan media
