= LALD =

LALD is an initialism that may refer to:

- Live and Let Die
  - Live and Let Die (novel), a James Bond novel by Ian Fleming
    - Live and Let Die (film), a 1973 film starring Roger Moore loosely based upon the novel
    - Live and Let Die (soundtrack), the soundtrack album of the 1973 film
    - "Live and Let Die" (song), a song by Paul McCartney and Wings from the above soundtrack
  - Live and Let Die (album), the final album by hip-hop duo Kool G Rap & DJ Polo
- Lysosomal Acid Lipase Deficiency, a disease caused when the body does not produce enough active lysosomal acid lipase enzyme
- Liquid Atomic Layer Deposition

== See also ==
- Live and Let Die (disambiguation)
