= Moral progress =

Societal evolution of ethical standards

Moral progress refers to the improvement and advancement of ethical standards, principles, and behaviors within societies over time. Michele Moody-Adams noted that "moral progress in belief involves deepening our grasp of existing moral concepts, while moral progress in practices involves realizing deepened moral understandings in behavior or social institutions".

== Definitions ==
Allen Buchanan defined moral progress as "morally progressive changes in social practices and institutions ... movement towards some morally desirable condition or state of affairs". Michele Moody-Adams defined local moral progress as "coming to appreciate more fully the richness and the range of applications of a particular moral concept", or developing a new one, and the spread of "practices embodying deepened understanding of justice and related moral notions"; in other words, a deepening of our grasp of moral concepts. Another view is that moral progress is "a greater success in describing moral reality".

Moral progress on a societal scale should not be confused with moral development in individuals, occasionally also referred to as moral progress.

== Aspects ==
Changes in social practices and institutions can precede and ultimately foster changes in individual moral beliefs throughout society. Progress in moral practices can be achieved through governmental incentives, even without deeper moral understanding among the population. This can lead to faster progress in practices than in beliefs; in other words, with external pressures, individuals and organizations may behave better not because of their inherent beliefs, but because of considerations of social expediency and enlightened self-interest. Buchanan differentiates between improvements from a moral point of view, which are caused by external factors, some possibly independent of human motivation and agency, and genuine moral progress. However, he notes that the former generally leads to the later anyway.

Moral progress in the last few centuries has been often the result of the actions of morally progressive social movements who attempt to popularize new morals.

Measurement of universal moral progress is difficult, because there is no universal consensus in regards to the final destination, nor objective standards of ethics. Most complex moral concepts have more than a single established definition. This makes measuring moral progress even more difficult from measuring human progress in general. Measurement of local, more specific moral progress are easier, as it is simpler to reach consensus on local, more specific ethical issues. As Musschenga and Meyned noted, "Most contemporary Dutchmen will agree that the Netherlands since the 16th century made moral progress. It is doubtful whether Dutchmen from the 16th century would also agree." Jeremy Evans, however, made an argument that is should be possible to create a definition of moral progress that "relies on a correlation between increasing population welfare ... and ethical advancement".

== Types of moral progress ==
Buchanan provides a typology of moral progress:

- better compliance with valid moral norms,
- better moral concepts,
- better understanding of the virtues,
- better moral motivation,
- better moral reasoning,
- proper demoralization,
- proper moralization,
- better understanding of moral standing and moral statuses,
- improvements in the understanding of the nature of morality, and
- better understanding of justice.

=== Moral circle expansion ===
Moral circle expansion is the process of increasing the number and type of entities given moral consideration over time. Social scientist Jacy Reese Anthis, for example, has argued for moral circle expansion as an important metric of moral progress and as an approach to bettering the long-term future for all sentient beings. His organization, the Sentience Institute, researches moral circle expansion via studying historical and current examples of moral progress, such as the British abolitionist movement.

== Examples ==
Buchanan called the modern human rights movement "the most robust instance of [moral] progress" Other examples of moral progress may include:

- improvement in the treatment of all individuals in the form of the abolition of slavery, reduction of racism and violent crimes like homicides, spread of political enfranchisement (right to vote), and other human rights like religious tolerance and freedom of expression, and the abolition of many cruel punishments,
- improvement in the treatment of women in the form of the development and spread of women's rights and gender equality,
- progress in international relations through the emergence of international norms discouraging or prohibiting behaviors such as wars and colonialism.

== See also ==
- Evolution of morality – Emergence of human moral behavior over the course of human evolution
- "How Long, Not Long" – Speech by Martin Luther King Jr.
- The Moral Arc – 2015 book by Michael Shermer
- The Better Angels of Our Nature – 2011 book by Steven Pinker
- Moral philosophy – Philosophical study of morality
- Moral relativism – Philosophical positions about the differences in moral judgments across peoples and cultures
- Pragmatic ethics – An ethical theory that emphasizes moral progress
- Social progress
- Sociocultural evolution – Evolution of societies
- Whig history – Approach to historiography
