= Peaceable Kingdom =

Peaceable Kingdom may refer to

- Peaceable Kingdom (theology), an eschatological state inferred from texts such as the Book of Isaiah, the Book of Hosea, and the Sermon on the Mount

== Art ==
- Peaceable Kingdom, a series of 62 paintings by Edward Hicks started in 1820
- "The Peaceable Kingdom", a 1936 a cappella choral work, settings from the book of Isaiah, by Randall Thompson (inspired by the Hicks paintings)
- The Peaceable Kingdom, a 1954 poetry collection by Jon Silkin
- Arrangements of peaceable animals, such as the lamb and lion, in heraldry, etc.

== Publications ==
- A Peaceable Kingdom: the Shaker abecedarius, a 1978 picture book illustrated by Alice and Martin Provensen
- Peaceable Kingdom, a 2003 short story collection by Jack Ketchum
- The Peaceable Kingdom, a 1998 short story collection by Francine Prose
- The Peaceable Kingdom: An American Saga, a 1972 novel by Jan de Hartog
- The Peaceable Kingdom: A Primer in Christian Ethics, a 1983 book by Stanley Hauerwas
- The Peaceable Kingdom, a 1949 novel by Ardyth Kennelly
- "The Peaceable Kingdom", a 1997 essay by Edward Hoagland
- Canada: a Guide to the Peaceable Kingdom, ed. William Kilbourn (1970)

== Film and television ==
- Peaceable Kingdom, a television drama aired by CBS in 1989
- Peaceable Kingdom (film), a 2004 documentary film about farmers who convert to veganism
  - Peaceable Kingdom: The Journey Home, a 2009 version of the 2004 film
- The Peaceable Kingdom, a 1971 short film by Stan Brakhage

== Music ==
- "Peaceable Kingdom", a song from Vapor Trails (2002) by Rush
- "Peaceable Kingdom", a song from Trampin' (2004) by Patti Smith
