= Post Punk Kitchen =

American vegan television cooking program

- Genre: Vegan Cooking
- Created by: Isa Chandra Moskowitz
- Country of origin: United States
- Original language: English

Production
- Production location: Brooklyn

Original release
- Release: 2003 – 2004

The Post Punk Kitchen began as a vegan cooking show created and hosted by Isa Chandra Moskowitz and Terry Hope Romero. It aired on Brooklyn and Manhattan public-access television cable TV from 2003 to 2004. After the show ended, The Post Punk Kitchen turned into a recipe website.

== History ==
When Moskowitz was in her thirites, she became "largely disconnected from the punk scene" of her youth, and was dividing her time "between a cubicle job and cooking in a vegan cafe...[she] was also watching a lot of cooking shows on TV." Frustrated by the lack of vegan cooking shows, and inspired by the agency of punk rock, she decided to create her own cooking show.

She took a class through BRIC Arts Media that took her through the basics of tv production. She then spent a few weeks developing a name for the show that would both sound "punk" but also reflect that she "wasn't feeling that punk anymore." Next she gave an interview to Bust (magazine), asked her friend Terry Hope Romero to do the interview with her, and to co-host the first episode of the show (Romero stayed for the entire series). Her neighbor Denise had a television production company and took over all production aspects of the show. The cooking took place in Moskowitz's actual kitchen.

== See also ==
- List of vegan and plant-based media
