= Anna Jones (food writer) =

British food writer and stylist

Anna Jones is a food writer and food stylist based in London.

== Early life and education ==
Jones lived in Palo Alto, California, until she was 7.

== Career ==
In 2004, Jones joined Jamie Oliver's restaurant Fifteen as an apprentice, working for him for seven years.

Jones is a cookbook author and a regular columnist for The Guardian. Her work focusses on vegetables and vegetarian cookery. She has appeared on television for Saturday Kitchen and Living on the Veg.

In March 2025, Meghan Markle was accused of stealing Jones' recipe "Single-skillet spaghetti" on her TV programme With Love, Meghan. Markle's show did not acknowledge Jones’ dish and Markle declined to comment.

== Books ==
- A Modern Way to Eat, HarperCollins, 2014
- A Modern Way to Cook, HarperCollins, 2015
- The Modern Cook's Year, HarperCollins, 2017
- One: Pot, Pan, Planet, HarperCollins, 2021
- Easy Wins HarperCollins, 2024

== Awards ==
- Observer Food Monthly Cookery Book of the Year, for The Modern Cook's Year, 2018
- Cookery Book of the Year, Guild of Food Writers, for The Modern Cook's Year, 2018

== Personal life ==
Jones became a vegetarian in the mid-2000s. As of 2016 she was married with one child and lived in East London.
