= Chris Huriwai =

New Zealand unicyclist (born 1992)

Pere Huriwai-Seger, formerly known as Christian Huriwai, (born 1 February 1992) is an extreme street unicyclist from Kaikohe, New Zealand. He is the former and three time street world champion after taking the title from Adrien Delecroix during UNICON XV, in Wellington, New Zealand in 2009–10.

Pere Huriwai runs his own unicycle team, Hippo Unicycles, focusing on increasing unicycle participation and creating a base of content for extreme unicycling in New Zealand and Australia.

Pere Huriwai created UniQuest, "an online unicycle tutorial series, to give aspiring unicyclists the guidance that (he) received from (his) role models when (he) started".

He is a vegan, and co-produced the 2021 documentary Milked, in which he investigates various negative effects of New Zealand's dairy industry on the environment, health, and animals.

He and his partner Samah Huriwai-Seger are activists, sharing anti-oppression content on decolonialism, veganism, and sociopolitical issues, including co-governance as Aotearoa Liberation League.
