= Vegucated =

- Directed by: Marisa Miller Wolfson
- Screenplay by: Marisa Miller Wolfson
- Story by: Marisa Miller Wolfson
- Starring: Tesla Lobo, Brian Flegel, Ellen Mausner, Marisa Miller Wolfson, Joel Fuhrman, T. Colin Campbell
- Cinematography: John Pierce
- Release date: September 10, 2011 (Toronto Independent Film Festival)
- Running time: 76 min.
- Country: United States
- Language: English

Vegucated is a 2011 American documentary film that explores the challenges of transitioning to a vegan diet.

== Response ==
VegNews listed it as one of "The 18 Best Vegan Documentaries to Start Streaming Now" in 2024.

=== Awards ===
- Best Documentary, Toronto Independent Film Festival, 2011
- Chris Award For Best Educational Film, Columbus International Film & Video Festival
- Best Food Issue, Cinema Verde Environmental Film and Arts Festival, 2012

== Companion cookbook ==
Wolfson released the companion cookbook, The Vegucated Family Table in 2020. VegNews listed it as one of the "Top 100 Vegan Cookbooks of All Time" in 2024.

- The Vegucated Family Table: Irresistible Vegan Recipes and Proven Tips for Feeding Plant-Powered Babies, Toddlers, and Kids. Ten Speed Press, 2020. ISBN 978-1984857170.

== See also ==
- List of vegan and plant-based media
