= Live or Let Die =

Live or Let Die may refer to:

- To Live or Let Die, a 1982 short documentary film
- "Live or Let Die" (CSI: NY), an episode of CSI: NY

== See also ==
- Live and Let Die (disambiguation)
