= The Lion and the Lamb =

The Lion and the Lamb may refer to:

- The Lion and the Lamb (film), a 1931 American Pre-Code film, based on the novel
- The Lion and the Lamb (novel), a 1930 novel by E. Phillips Oppenheim
- "The Lion and the Lamb" (song), a 2016 song by Big Daddy Weave
- Helm Crag § The Lion and the Lamb, an English rock formation

== See also ==
- Lamb and lion (disambiguation)
