= Hetty Lui McKinnon =

Australian Chinese cookbook author and food writer

- Born: Sydney, Australia
- Occupations: food writer; author
- Writing career
- Subject: Vegetarian/Plant-based/Vegan cookbooks
- Notable works: Tenderheart: A Cookbook About Vegetables and Unbreakable Family Bonds
- Notable awards: James Beard Foundation Award

Hetty Lui McKinnon is an Australian Chinese vegetarian/plant-based/vegan cookbook author, recipe developer, food writer, and James Beard Award finalist and winner. She has written six cookbooks with the fifth, Tenderheart: A Cookbook About Vegetables and Unbreakable Family Bonds winning the James Beard Award for Vegetable Focused Cooking in 2024.

== Early life ==
McKinnon was born in Sydney to Chinese immigrant parents from Guangdong, China. Her father immigrated in the late 50s and her mother arrived in the early 1960s. She has two siblings and is the youngest sibling.

McKinnon's father worked at the Flemington Markets as an importer and exporter of bananas. He brought fresh produce back for his family, which had a huge influence on McKinnon's later cooking. McKinnon's father died in 1989, when she was 15 years old.

McKinnon's Australian upbringing and cross-cultural experiences profoundly shaped her. She recalls feeling like a minority outside of her home while also growing up in a traditional Chinese household. McKinnon has stated that food was central to her family, calling it a "common language." Although McKinnon grew up eating her mother's Cantonese food, she did not really cook in her childhood.

When she was a 15-year-old high school student, McKinnon's career advisor dissuaded her from becoming a journalist, and encouraged her to study public relations instead.

== Career ==
In the early 2000s, McKinnon moved to London because her husband got a job there. She got a job at a PR agency. McKinnon resided there for four years before moving back to Sydney with her husband.

After her move back to Sydney, McKinnon was freelancing for a PR agency, but found herself gravitating towards cooking. When Mckinnon would put her children down for their naps, she would cook through Yotam Ottolenghi's first cookbook. She credits this as a major turning point that helped her fall in love with cooking, learn practical techniques, and layer flavors.

In 2011, McKinnon founded Arthur Street Kitchen, a community kitchen making salads that highlight local produce, in Sydney's Surry Hills neighborhood. She made salads and sweets out of her home kitchen and delivered them by bike throughout the neighborhood. The menu would rotate, ranging from salads she had been making for years to ones inspired by classic dishes. McKinnon emailed out a weekly menu to subscribers that featured two salads a day, making deliveries on Thursday and Friday for up to forty people.

In 2017, McKinnon began publishing a multicultural food magazine called The Peddler Journal.

In 2018, McKinnon began a monthly column on ABC Everyday. She is also a regular contributor to New York Times Cooking, The Washington Post, Bon Appetit, and Epicurious.

=== Cookbooks ===
After about a year, McKinnon decided to write a cookbook. McKinnon was inspired by people asking for her salad recipes, which taught her to develop and write recipes. She met the book's photographer, Luisa Brimble, during an interview with Broadsheet magazine, a Sydney-based magazine. In 2013, McKinnon self-published Community, which was initially just supposed to be for Arthur Street Kitchen's subscribers. However, after a feature in the Australian website The Design Files, McKinnon sold out of cookbooks. A publisher at Pan Macmillan saw her cookbook and published it throughout Australia, where it sold upwards of 80,000 copies.

In 2015, McKinnon moved to New York City's Carroll Gardens. There, she wrote her second book, Neighborhood, over the course of three months.

Her third cookbook, Family, focuses on "vegetarian comfort food." She was inspired by the crowd-pleasing meals she cooked for her children, which were much more kid-friendly than the salads she made for Arthur Street Kitchen.

Her fourth cookbook, To Asia, with Love, came out in 2020. McKinnon shot all the photos for this book. The book features easy Asian recipes and draws heavy influence from her experience as a third culture kid. In interviews, McKinnon discussed how this cookbook was a way for her to reclaim her Chinese Australian heritage and celebrate Asian food culture.

McKinnon credits her fifth cookbook, Tenderheart, as a means of processing the emotions around her father's death. Originally, she planned to write the cookbook about her favorite vegetables, but felt gravitated to write about her father. Many of the recipes in the book incorporate foods that he loved, like garlic chile oil, adobo, and tater tots.

== Awards and honors ==
Year	Awards and Honors	Event
2024	James Beard Foundation Award	James Beard Foundation Award: Vegetable Focused Cooking for Tenderheart: A Cookbook About Vegetables and Unbreakable Family Bonds.
2022	Finalist (nominated)	James Beard Foundation Award: Vegetable Focused Cooking for To Asia, with Love: Everyday Asian Recipes and Stories from the Heart.
2019	Best Illustrated Book of the Year	Australian Book Industry Awards for Family: New Vegetarian Comfort Foods to Nourish Every Day.
2015	Best Illustrated Book of the Year (Shortlisted)	Australian Book Industry Awards for Community.

== Published works ==
- Community (2013) ISBN 9781760786571
- Neighborhood (2016) ISBN 9781743538982
- Family: New Vegetarian Comfort Foods to Nourish Every Day (2019) ISBN 9781760554576
- To Asia, with Love: Everyday Asian Recipes and Stories from the Heart (2020) ISBN 9781760787677
- Tenderheart: A Book about Vegetables and Unbreakable Family Bonds (2022) ISBN 9780593534861
- Linger (2025). ISBN 9780593804193

== Personal life ==
McKinnon has been vegetarian since she was 19 years old. In an interview, she stated that she had a general dislike of meat and went fully vegetarian once she started university.

McKinnon has three children.

== See also ==
- List of vegan and plant-based media
