= Meet Your Meat =

2002 documentary

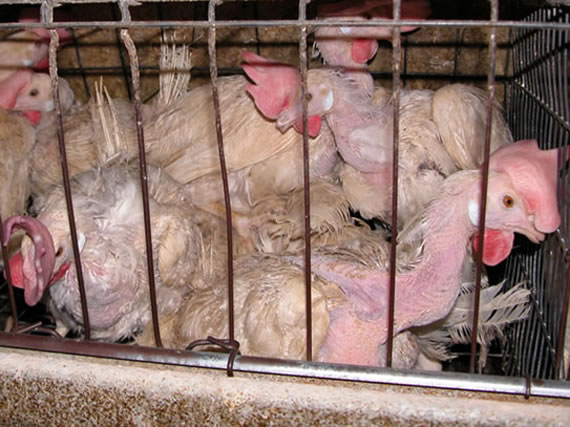
Battery cage, an example of the inhumane practices shown in the film

Meet Your Meat is a 2002 documentary about factory farming created by People for the Ethical Treatment of Animals (PETA), narrated by Alec Baldwin, and directed by Bruce Friedrich and Cem Akin. The documentary explores the treatment of animals in modern animal agriculture (also known as industrial agriculture or factory farming). The film runs 12 minutes long.

The film documents several cases of cruelty to animals, including:

- Egg-laying hens live in crowded cages, six or seven hens to one battery cage the size of a file drawer.
- Cattle are castrated, their horns are removed and third-degree burns (livestock branding) are inflicted on them, all without anesthetic.
- Cows used for their milk have calves removed from them shortly after birth. These calves are sent to veal farms.
- Chickens bred and drugged to grow so quickly that their hearts, lungs, and limbs often can't keep up.
- Mother pigs (sows) are confined to gestation crates that are so small that the pigs cannot turn around or even lie down.
- Baby pigs (piglets) are castrated, their teeth clipped, tails docked and ears clipped.
- Chickens' and turkeys' beaks are burned or cut off without anesthetic.

Meet Your Meat helped influence Burger King to adopt more humane policies.

== See also ==
- The Meatrix
- List of vegan and plant-based media
- Earthlings
