= BOSH! =

English vegan chef duo

- Born: Henry Firth; Ian Theasby
- Occupation: Chefs

YouTube information
- Channel: BOSH.TV
- Years active: 2016–present
- Genre: Cooking
- Subscribers: 244,000
- Views: 30 million
- Last updated: 4 August 2026
- Website: bosh.tv

Based and founded in Milton Keynes, BOSH! is a duo of English vegan chefs from Sheffield consisting of Henry Firth and Ian Theasby. They rose to fame in 2016 with the launch of their YouTube channel, and have gone on to host the ITV1 television programme Living on the Veg and author a number of books. Their eponymous vegan cookbook ranked fifth in the Sunday Times Bestsellers chart in 2018, and is among the top 50 best-selling UK cookbooks of all time.

== Early life ==
Firth was born in Hackney, a district of East London, in April 1984. Son of a teacher and professor, he worked in the tech industry for 12 years after leaving Sixth Form, for various companies including Blacks, Arcadia Group and Drum&BassArena. Theasby was born in Sheffield in August 1984, he is the son of a nurse and a teacher. He worked in the fashion industry after leaving school, choosing not to attend university. Firth and Theasby's relationship began at the age of 11 when the pair attended High Storrs School in Sheffield.

The pair became vegan in the mid-2010s: Theasby aimed to give something up each month and after an alcohol-free January, decided on giving up meat for February and additionally giving up dairy in March. The pair watched the documentary Cowspiracy together, after which Firth became vegan. They were concerned over the environmental impact of meat production.

== Career ==
In 2016, Firth and Theasby launched BOSH.TV, a social media channel publishing videos of vegan cookery. The name BOSH! was chosen because it "sound[ed] fast and fun and the very opposite of fussy", a mantra they took into their video production style. The duo adopted a camera style similar to that of other YouTube food brands like BuzzFeed Tasty, with the hope that the vegan nature of their content would help set them apart. BOSH's initial success came in the form of a 'healthy sushi cake' video, which hit 3.5m views on Facebook, and a viral 'watermelon Jagerbomb' video which racked up 20 million views across all platforms. A profile in The Times dubbed them "the vegan Jamie Olivers".

In 2018, BOSH! released their first vegan cookbook of the same name. It became the UK's best-selling vegan cookbook of all time, and one of the 50 best-selling UK cookbooks. It received a British Book Award and a PETA Vegan Food Award. They subsequently published several further cookbooks and the book How to Live Vegan. Their first book reached 350,000 UK sales in 2018. By 2022, the pair had reached a million sales from books published in 60 countries in eight languages. At this point the revenue from UK print sales (excluding lockdown periods) was £6 million, from 600,000 sales.

Alongside their range of cookbooks, Firth and Theasby brought BOSH! to British television screens in 2020 with their ITV1 show Living on the Veg. The 10-part series was ITV's first vegan cooking programme, and featured a series of recipes cooked by Firth and Theasby and a guest who talks about food and their work.

BOSH! have appeared on television programmes such as Good Morning Britain, This Morning, BBC Breakfast, Sunday Brunch, and The Today Show. They were interviewed for BBC Radio 2 by presenters Claudia Winkleman, Michael Ball and Jo Whiley.

== BOSH! products ==
BOSH! launched a range of plant-based products into supermarkets nationwide across the UK. The range of products includes cake mixes, savoury mixes, store cupboard products, sweet treats and ready meals, with the intention of encouraging individuals to adopt the vegan diet.

As well as being stocked in all major UK supermarkets, BOSH! products are all available in Costa Coffee shops UK-wide.

== Books ==
- BOSH! (2018)
- Bish Bash BOSH! (2019)
- How to Live Vegan (2019)
- BOSH! Healthy Vegan (2019)
- Speedy BOSH! (2020)
- BOSH! on a Budget (2021)
- BOSH! Meat (2023)

== Partnerships ==
- Brewdog – Released two BOSH! beers and designed plant-based options for pub menus
- Alpro – Ambassadors
- Tesco – Launched Vegmas Christmas campaign
- Kettle Chips – Launched first plant-based cheese and onion crisps
- Vitalite – On-pack promotion for BOSH! METHOD – a plant based cooking course
- AXA – AXA Start Up Angel Judges

== Awards and honours ==
- BOSH! – 2018 Best Book – PETA Vegan Food Awards
- BOSH! – Silver Nielssen Award for more than 250,000 UK copies sold
- BOSH! – British Book Awards 2019 Non-fiction: Lifestyle Book of the Year
- BOSH! – 2019 Marketing Strategy of the Year – British Book Awards (Nibbies)
- Speedy BOSH! – 2020 Best Vegan Cookbook – PETA Vegan Food Awards

== See also ==
- List of vegan media
