= Eating You Alive =

- Film poster
- Directed by: Paul David Kennamer Jr.
- Written by: Paul David Kennamer Jr.
- Produced by: Merrilee Jacobs; Paul David Kennamer Jr.
- Edited by: Paul David Kennamer Jr.
- Music by: Michael Omartian
- Production company: Smallbox Entertainment Group
- Distributed by: Gravitas Ventures
- Release date: April 5, 2018
- Running time: 108 minutes
- Country: United States
- Language: English

Eating You Alive is a 2018 health documentary film about why Americans are suffering from chronic diseases such as cardiovascular disease, diabetes, obesity, autoimmune disease, among other diseases, and whether the outcome can be changed.

Paul David Kennamer Jr.'s film Eating You Alive addresses why and what Americans consume is the source of chronic diseases that harm the population, and can as well be the solution to save lives one meal at a time by improving people’s diet. In Eating You Alive, leading nutritionists and medical professionals provide a practical look at why Americans are so unhealthy, what is accountable for this, and how using whole-food, plant-based foods can improve an individual’s health. Kennamer and producer Merrilee Jacobs stated they were inspired by their personal experiences with whole-food, plant-based diets. The Executive Producer was Dan Purjes, and the film is owned by the non-profit Purjes Foundation.

The documentary features Samuel L. Jackson, James Cameron, Neal D. Barnard, Joel Fuhrman, Michael Greger, and Dean Ornish, among others.

== Production ==
Directed by Paul David Kennamer Jr., Eating You Alive was officially released April 5, 2018 in the United States. The film was screened in 569 theaters. To film Eating You Alive, the production team traveled extensively to interview scientific researchers, physicians, celebrities, gourmet cooks, and patients whose lives were transformed using this nutritional approach.

== Film summary ==
The documentary discusses the benefits of a proper diet to reduce millions of Americans' deaths each year due to chronic diseases. Each year millions of deaths worldwide are due to chronic diseases, Cardiovascular disease being the leading cause of death at 17.3 million per year.

The film focuses on the continuous rise of chronic diseases in Americans as a result of diet habits. It criticizes Americans' diet, and proposes how a change in nutrition can reverse the effects of chronic diseases. The film advised tips and innovative ways of consuming products that can improve well-being, where people that have switched from the traditional American diet to a whole-food, plant-based lifestyle have shown major improvement. Further, it addressed flaws in the health care system concerning American's health and their diet as well as pollution consequences tied to diet because the animals being consumed emit large amounts of methane, a powerful greenhouse gas.

The film states that chronic diseases are the leading cause of death and disability in the US, where chronic diseases such as cardiovascular disease, cancer, and diabetes affect three-quarters of the adult population and the direct causes can be traced to the food eaten in their daily diets. The documentary talks about the correlation of the American diet and its contribution, as physicians referred to in the film, to the most obese population in the history of the human race where 68.8% of American adults are overweight or obese. Physicians and nutritionists in the documentary address how food in the American diet has certain chemical components that have “enslaved” people into the vast consumption of these foods. These experts claim that the food consumed in the diets of Americans can lead to developing chronic diseases such as cancer, diabetes, hypertension, obesity, and believed that if foods cause diseases, they can also cure them.

The documentary exposes that the standard American diet, also known as the Western pattern diet, is high in sugar, fats, and salt. The experts go on to say that in the last decade, Americans have dramatically increased their intake of sugar, meat, fat, and calories, claiming that these components trigger dopamine reward signals that create dependence on, and addiction to, certain foods, and in the case of sugar, the ability to suppress the immune system. The documentary addresses flaws in the health care system that contribute to the underlying causes of chronic diseases concerning Americans' diet and health. The film criticizes how the medical system is focused on treating the symptoms of diseases and not the causes and how to prevent them, where the American health care program is outstanding at managing cancer and illness signs but not the prevention. Throughout the film, various physicians express concern about medical school education and the lack of education towards nutrition. The physicians state that nutrition topics were not addressed as it should be and very minimalist. They emphasize that doctors are taught in the first place on how to treat diseases but not how to prevent them. The documentary discusses an issue of billions of dollars being spent on medical care, experimental medicines and revolutionary health-enhancing technologies, but still, more Americans are suffering from debilitating chronic illness.

In the film, the experts interviewed conclude that to the problem of chronic diseases, the remedy is better eating, especially a whole food, plant-based diet, where such conditions as high blood pressure, diabetes, and cancer could be mediated through dietary means instead of medication. The film's experts say that a whole diet focused on plants can not only eliminate a variety of diseases but can also reverse them. The film's experts, as well as witnesses who previously have been ill, express that plant-based nutrition can lower cholesterol levels, thus reversing cardiovascular illnesses. Physicians and nutritionists in the documentary state that giving up dairy, meat and processed food can lead to losing a variety of chronic diseases.

== Reception ==
A reviewer for the Deseret News notes that the film is less an investigative documentary and more an advocacy film that presents a single cause and then a desired solution, but also states that the content of the film is useful and informative while not likely to persuade non-vegans. Mayim Bialik praised the film on Twitter. The Portland Press Herald says the pro-vegan film is thought-provoking. Kennamer was interviewed about the film by Kathie Lee Gifford and Hoda Kotb on Today.

== See also ==
- List of vegan and plant-based media
