= The End of Animal Farming =

2018 book by Jacy Reese Anthis

- Cover of the first edition
- Author: Jacy Reese Anthis
- Language: English
- Publisher: Beacon Press
- Publication date: November 6, 2018
- ISBN: 0807019453

The End of Animal Farming: How Scientists, Entrepreneurs, and Activists Are Building an Animal-Free Food System is a 2018 book by Jacy Reese that argues animal farming will end by the year 2100 based on effective altruism reasoning and social movement strategy.

== Summary ==
The book outlines the principles of the philosophy of effective altruism and details the history of humanity's moral progress over millennia. It then documents the current state of factory farming and the farmed animal movement that seeks to reform or abolish animal agriculture. The book then discusses various strategies that can be and are being utilized, such as cage-free egg campaigns, vegetarian activism, and innovative food technologies such as plant-based and cellular agriculture. It argues for a strategic focus on changing institutions instead of changing individuals, a focus on "trigger events", rhetoric that emphasizes how to eat animal-free food instead of why, utilizing stories before citing statistics about animal agriculture, and finally a selective use of confrontational activism. It ends by circling back to the expanding moral circle and arguing that advocates should engender a broad moral understanding rather than addressing moral issues one by one.

== Reception ==
Coverage of the book was mostly positive, noting the provocative thesis of the book and the contemporary emergence of plant-based and cell-based food products. Some reviewers emphasized Reese's background growing up in Texas near cattle ranches, while noting the challenges of reaching a wide audience with a conventional vegan message. Molly Brown at GeekWire and Kelsey Piper at Vox emphasized the transition happening from the conventional "vegan diatribe" to approaches focused on mass consumer appeal and innovative food technology. The book was praised for its optimistic outlook despite the gravity of factory farming.

The book faced criticism from Current Affairs due to its focus on effective altruism. Nathan J. Robinson wrote:

The End of Animal Farming is written from the "effective altruist" point of view, and carries both that movement's best and worst tendencies. At their best, the effective altruists help hone our moral reasoning, and focus on being useful rather than seeming virtuous. You can see that in Reese's approach: He wants to convince you that ending animal farming is possible, and lay out a series of steps by which it might be achieved, not just show that it's important. In fact, he spends little time making the moral case, which is quite simple, and the bulk of the book is dedicated to solutions. Unfortunately, the "effective altruists'" frustrating qualities are on display too. In a chapter on how we might further "expand our moral circle," Reese discusses some of the EA movement's other pet causes (such as preventing an artificially intelligent creature from enslaving humanity) and mulls on moral questions about space colonization and the civil rights of future robot servants. This eccentric altruism is not based on evidence, but upon thought experiments about possible distant futures (Reese mentions "whole brain emulation"), and causes some EA adherents to think their time is wisely spent trying to help prevent far-fetched hypothetical future-suffering rather than actual present-suffering.

In The New Republic, Rachel Riederer commented:

Reese's book isn't likely to win the hearts and palates of many meat eaters. Its tone is coolly dry, bordering on mathematical. Part of this comes from Reese's commitment to effective altruism, whose adherents say they use “evidence and careful analysis to find the very best causes” rather than "just doing what feels right." It might be a refreshing shift in tone from the extreme compassion and occasional sanctimony that can surround arguments for animal welfare, and it's certainly a sensible way to organize the activities of an advocacy group—but as the engine of a work of nonfiction, the constant emphasis on efficiency runs a little cold. Even Reese's discussion of suffering itself is mathematical, as he calculates the amount of harm a farm does by the number of animals it keeps and the number of hours they spend there, without accounting for differences in their consciousness. He gives the suffering of a fish the same weight as the suffering of a pig. Yet despite its structure and tone, the book's underlying argument itself is important.

Davide Banis in Forbes wrote that The End of Animal Farming is "little more than a thorough overview of the topic, meaning that the author just piles up a series of fairly known facts about animal farming, lacking more original insights. At times, it feels like a 'positioning book': a book written just to position the author as an expert in a burgeoning field."

An excerpt from the book on the topic of humane animal agriculture was featured in The Guardian.

== See also ==
- Animal–industrial complex
- Commodity status of animals
- List of vegan and plant-based media
- Speciesism
- Veganism
