= Laurel's Kitchen =

Book by Carol Lee Flinders

The New Laurel's Kitchen (1986)
- First edition
- Author: Laurel Robertson, Carol Flinders, Bronwen Godfrey (1976); Laurel Robertson, Carol Flinders, Brian Ruppenthal (1986)
- Original title: Laurel's Kitchen (1976)
- Language: English
- Genre: Vegetarian cuisine
- Publisher: Nilgiri Press; Ten Speed Press
- Publication date: 1976; 1986
- Pages: 511
- ISBN: 0-89815-167-8

Laurel's Kitchen is a vegetarian cookbook by Laurel Robertson, Carol Flinders, and Bronwen Godfrey that contributed to the rise of the vegetarian movement of the 1970s. It is also the name of Flinder's syndicated news column that she wrote for many years.

== Background and influence ==
Carol Lee Flinders was a student of Eknath Easwaran, whose influence led to her interest in vegetarianism. She created the vegetarian cookbook Laurel's Kitchen (1976), with a few of his other students, Laurel Robertson and Bronwen Godfrey. Laurel's Kitchen had a strong impact on the natural foods movement within the American counterculture. A second edition, The New Laurel's Kitchen, was published in 1986. It had the same subtitle and the same first two authors, and Brian Ruppenthal was the new third author.

The book has sold over a million copies. Laurel's Kitchen contained extensive nutritional information from a scientific point of view, and sold more than a million copies.

Flinders also wrote a weekly syndicated column called “Laurel’s Kitchen” for a number of years.

In 1978, Yoga Journal contained two reviews of Laurel's Kitchen, by different authors. In 1994, the Vegetarian Times, a leading magazine for vegetarians, surveyed the most admired cookbooks among a "panel of cookbook authors, food editors, and chefs." The New Laurel's Kitchen was the "clear winner" for "best cookbook for beginners" (p. 107).

== Scholarship ==
A book by Megan Elias (2008), published by the University of Pennsylvania Press, devoted 9 pages to analyzing the book and its place in American culture, contending that "Laurel's Kitchen was as much a lifestyle guide as it was a cookbook" (p. 153).

A scholarly review stated that Elias "gives the renowned countercultural cookbook Laurel’s Kitchen its proper due in American history.... she sees Laurel Robertson and her comrades Carol Flinders and Bronwyn Godfrey struggling, in an intelligent and heartfelt way, against the manipulations of the market, which devalued nutritious food, meaningful domestic labor, and communal connections" (p. 417).

A scholarly book by Mary Drake McFeely (2001) also spent several pages discussing Laurel's Kitchen, which it described as "the Fannie Farmer of vegetarian cooking" (p. 142).

== Bibliography ==
=== Cookbooks ===
- Laurel Robertson, Carol Lee Flinders, and Bronwen Godfrey (1976). Laurel's Kitchen: a handbook for vegetarian cookery & nutrition. Berkeley, CA: Nilgiri Press. ISBN 0-915132-07-9
- Laurel Robertson, Carol Lee Flinders, and Bronwen Godfrey (1978). Laurel's Kitchen: a handbook for vegetarian cookery & nutrition. New York: Bantam Books. ISBN 0-553-22565-0
- Laurel Robertson, Carol Lee Flinders, and Bronwen Godfrey (1979). Laurel's Kitchen: a handbook for vegetarian cookery & nutrition. London: Routledge & Kegan Paul Ltd. ISBN 0-7100-0281-5
- Laurel Robertson, Carol Lee Flinders, Bronwen Godfrey (1984). The Laurel's Kitchen bread book: a guide to whole-grain breadmaking. Random House. ISBN 0-394-53700-9
- Laurel Robertson, Carol Lee Flinders, and Brian Ruppenthal (1986). The New Laurel's Kitchen: a handbook for vegetarian cookery & nutrition. Berkeley, CA: Ten Speed Press. ISBN 0-89815-167-8
- Laurel Robertson, Carol Lee Flinders, Brian Ruppenthal (1993, revised edition). Laurel's Kitchen recipes. Berkeley, CA: Ten Speed Press. ISBN 0-89815-537-1
- Laurel Robertson, Carol Lee Flinders, Brian Ruppenthal (1997). Laurel's Kitchen caring: recipes for everyday home caregiving. Berkeley, CA: Ten Speed Press. ISBN 0-89815-951-2

=== Laurel's Kitchen syndicated column ===
Flinders published the syndicated newspaper column based on her cookbook, Laurel's Kitchen for many years. In 1987 it appeared in 20 newspapers. The column was published in a number of newspapers including The Spokesman-Review (Spokane, WA), and The Register-Guard (Eugene, OR).

== See also ==
- List of vegan and plant-based media
