= Isa Chandra Moskowitz =

American food writer (born 1973)

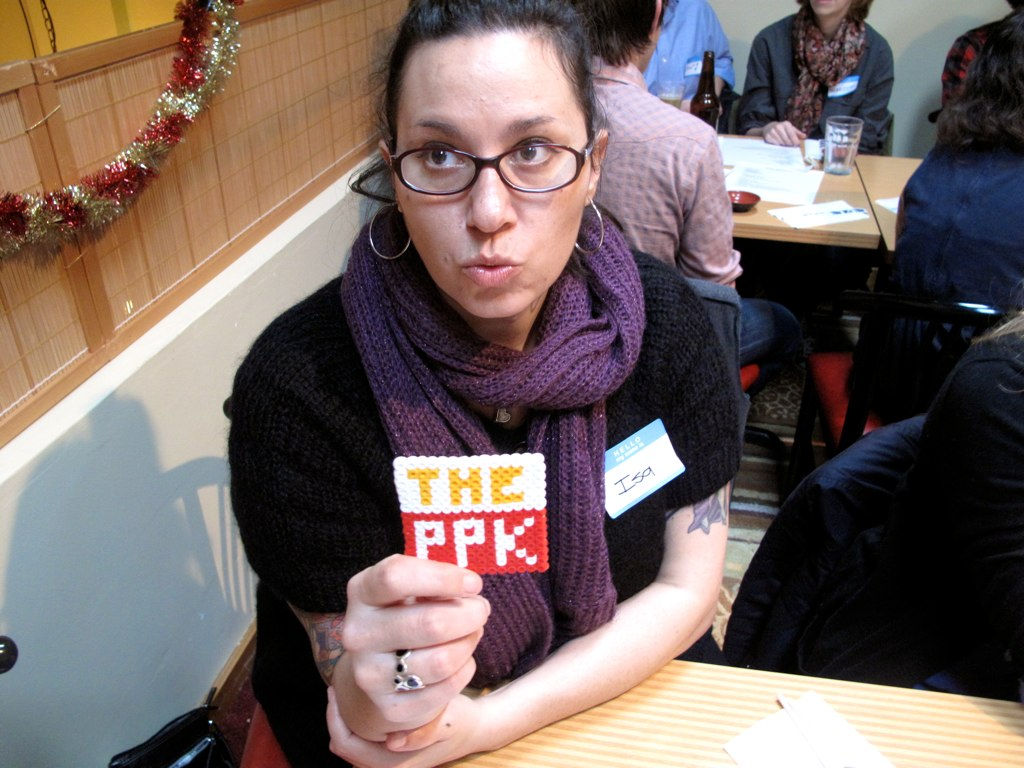
- Moskowitz in Omaha, Nebraska, 2010
- Born: Brooklyn, New York, U.S.
- Education: High School of Music & Art (dropped out)
- Occupations: Vegan chef; activist; cookbook author; cooking show host
- Writing career
- Subject: Veganism cookbooks
- Notable works: Vegan with a Vengeance (2005); Veganomicon, with Terry Hope Romero (2007); Isa Does It (2013); I Can Cook Vegan (2019)

Isa Chandra Moskowitz is an American vegan chef, cookbook author, former host of the vegan community access cooking show Post Punk Kitchen, and former restaurateur.

== Early life ==
Moskowitz was raised in Brooklyn, New York. She majored in fine art at the High School of Music & Art, but eventually dropped out. She became involved with the punk rock scene of the Lower East Side of Manhattan during the late 1980s. During this time, she became a vegetarian, then later turned to veganism. She also volunteered with Food Not Bombs.

== Career ==
=== Post Punk Kitchen ===
The Post Punk Kitchen began as a vegan cooking show that aired on Brooklyn and Manhattan public-access television cable TV from 2003 to 2004, and later became a recipe website.

=== Cookbooks ===
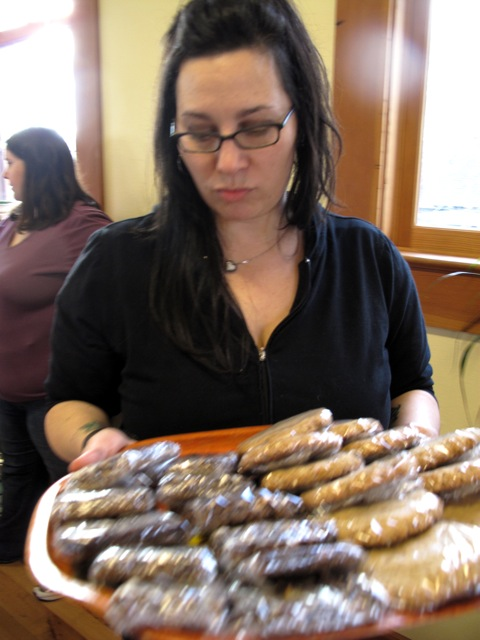
Moskowitz at a Vegan Bake Sale for Haiti event

The success of The Post Punk Kitchen led her to become a cookbook author, beginning in 2005 with her first cookbook Vegan with a Vengeance.

- Vegan with a Vengeance. 2005. ISBN 1-56924-358-1
- Vegan Cupcakes Take Over the World, with Terry Hope Romero. 2006. ISBN 1-56924-273-9
- Veganomicon, with Terry Hope Romero. 2007. ISBN 1-56924-264-X
- Vegan Brunch. 2009. ISBN 0-7382-1272-5
- Vegan Cookies Invade Your Cookie Jar, with Terry Hope Romero. 2009. ISBN 1-60094-048-X
- Appetite for Reduction. 2010. ISBN 978-1-60094-049-1
- Vegan Pie in the Sky. 2011. ISBN 978-0-7382-1274-6
- Isa Does It: Amazingly Easy, Wildly Delicious Vegan Recipes for Every Day of the Week. Little, Brown. 2013. ISBN 978-0-316-22190-0.
- Vegan with a Vengeance, 10th Anniversary Edition: Over 150 Delicious, Cheap, Animal-Free Recipes That Rock. 2015. ISBN 978-0738218335
- The Superfun Times Vegan Holiday Cookbook: Entertaining for Absolutely Every Occasion. 2016. ISBN 978-0-316-22189-4
- I Can Cook Vegan. 2019. ISBN 978-1419732416
- Fake Meat: Real Food For Vegan Appetites. Abrams. 2023. ISBN 978-1419747458.
- The 29-Minute Vegan: Real Food, Real Vibes, Anytime. 2026. ISBN 978-1419770128

Foreword

- Schinner, Miyoko (2015). The Homemade Vegan Pantry: The Art of Making Your Own Staples. New York: Ten Speed Press. ISBN 978-1607746775.

=== Restaurants ===
For over a decade, Moskowitz ran an independent restaurant chain, Modern Love (2014-2025). Her first restaurant opened in Omaha, Nebraska in 2014 and closed in 2024. A second location opened in Brooklyn in 2016 and closed in 2025.

=== Activism ===
Moskowitz is a vocal opponent of "humane meat", promoting animal rights through what she calls "Culinary Activism" or "Baketivism":

After the 2010 Haiti earthquake, Moskowitz posted on her blog a call for vegans to host bake sales in their home cities to fundraise for relief which resulted in over $75,000 being raised.

== Awards and honors ==
In 2023, Tasting Table named Moskowitz as one of the “21 Plant-Based Chefs You Need To Know,” and VegNews listed her as one of the "37 Creative Chefs Crafting the Future of Vegan Food."

In 2024, Food & Wine included both Veganomicon and Isa Does It: Amazingly Easy, Wildly Delicious Vegan Recipes for Every Day of the Week in their list of "the 20 Best Vegetarian Cookbooks for Every Type of Meal" in 2024. VegNews listed Veganomicon, Super fun Times Vegan Holiday Cookbook, Vegan Brunch, Isa Does It, and I Can Cook Vegan as "Top 100 Vegan Cookbooks of All Time" in 2024.

| Year | Awards and Honors | Event |
|---|---|---|
| 2020 | Favorite Vegan Chef: Chloe Coscarelli & Isa Chandra Moskowitz (tie) | VegNews: 2020 Veggie Awards |
| 2012 | Reader Picks: Favorite Cookbook Author – GOLD – Isa Chandra Moskowitz | VegNews: 2012 Veggie Awards |
| 2011 | Reader Picks: People & Media – Favorite Cookbook Authors: Isa Chandra Moskowitz & Terry Hope Romero | VegNews: 2011 Veggie Awards |
| 2010 | Reader Picks: Favorite Cookbook Author: Isa Chandra Moskowitz | VegNews: 2010 Veggie Awards |
| 2009 | Reader Picks: Favorite Cookbook Authors: Isa Chandra Moskowitz & Terry Hope Romero | VegNews: 2009 Veggie Awards |
| 2008 | Post Punk Kitchen Blog | VegNews: 2008 VegBloggy Awards |

== See also ==
- Animal rights and punk subculture
