= Carol Lee Flinders =

- Education: Stanford University, B.A. University of California, Berkeley, Ph.D.
- Occupations: Author, Educator
- Spouse: Tim Flinders
- Writing career
- Genres: Vegetarian Cooking; Spirituality
- Notable works: Laurel's Kitchen and The Making of a Teacher

Carol Lee Flinders is an author and former vegetarian food writer/syndicated columnist. She is best known as one of the three authors of the vegetarian cookbook Laurel's Kitchen along with Laurel Robertson and Bronwen Godfrey. She also wrote the syndicated news column "Laurel's Kitchen" based on the cookbook.

== Early life and education ==
Flinders was born to Gilbert H. and Jeanne Lee Ramage, and grew up on a farm in Oregon's Willamette Valley. In 1958 her family moved to Spokane. She graduated from North Central High School (Spokane, Washington) in 1961, later receiving a bachelor's degree from Stanford University, and a PhD in comparative literature from the University of California at Berkeley.

== Career ==
Flinders became nationally known in 1976 through her coauthorship of Laurel's Kitchen, a widely acclaimed guide to vegetarian cookery that has been described as a "renowned countercultural cookbook," and as "the Fannie Farmer of vegetarian cooking." Later, cultural historians contended that "Laurel's Kitchen was as much a lifestyle guide as it was a cookbook." Flinders also wrote a weekly syndicated column called “Laurel’s Kitchen” for a number of years.

Beginning in the late 1980s, Flinders published a series of books on spirituality. The first published in 1989,The Making of a Teacher, (coauthored with her husband Timothy Flinders) provided an oral history of the life and work of Eknath Easwaran, who had helped inspire the creation of Laurel's Kitchen.

She was a lecturer in spirituality at Holy Names College in Oakland, California.

== Works ==
=== Laurel's Kitchen cookbooks ===
- Laurel Robertson, Carol Lee Flinders, and Bronwen Godfrey (1976). Laurel's Kitchen: a handbook for vegetarian cookery & nutrition. Berkeley, CA: Nilgiri Press. ISBN 0-915132-07-9
- Laurel Robertson, Carol Lee Flinders, and Bronwen Godfrey (1978). Laurel's Kitchen: a handbook for vegetarian cookery & nutrition. New York: Bantam Books. ISBN 0-553-22565-0
- Laurel Robertson, Carol Lee Flinders, and Bronwen Godfrey (1979). Laurel's Kitchen: a handbook for vegetarian cookery & nutrition. London: Routledge & Kegan Paul Ltd. ISBN 0-7100-0281-5
- Laurel Robertson, Carol Lee Flinders, Bronwen Godfrey (1984). The Laurel's Kitchen bread book: a guide to whole-grain breadmaking. Random House. ISBN 0-394-53700-9
- Laurel Robertson, Carol Lee Flinders, and Brian Ruppenthal (1986). The New Laurel's Kitchen: a handbook for vegetarian cookery & nutrition. Berkeley, CA: Ten Speed Press. ISBN 0-89815-167-8
- Laurel Robertson, Carol Lee Flinders, Brian Ruppenthal (1993, revised edition). Laurel's Kitchen recipes. Berkeley, CA: Ten Speed Press. ISBN 0-89815-537-1
- Laurel Robertson, Carol Lee Flinders, Brian Ruppenthal (1997). Laurel's Kitchen caring: recipes for everyday home caregiving. Berkeley, CA: Ten Speed Press. ISBN 0-89815-951-2

=== Laurel's Kitchen syndicated column ===
Flinders published the syndicated newspaper column based on her cookbook, Laurel's Kitchen for many years. In 1987 it appeared in 20 newspapers. The column was published in a number of newspapers including The Spokesman-Review (Spokane, WA), and The Register-Guard (Eugene, OR).

=== Additional works ===
- Flinders, Carol (2006). Enduring Lives: Portraits of Women and Faith in Action. New York: Jeremy P. Tarcher/Penguin. ISBN 9781585424962. ISBN 158542496X
- Flinders, Carol (2003). Rebalancing the world: Why women belong and men compete and how to restore the ancient equilibrium. HarperCollins. ISBN 9780062517371.
- Flinders, Carol (1998). At the root of this longing: Reconciling a spiritual hunger and a feminist thirst. San Francisco, CA: HarperSanFrancisco. ISBN 0062513141. ISBN 006251315X
- Flinders, Carol (1993). Enduring grace: Living Portraits of Seven Women Mystics. San Francisco, CA: HarperSanFrancisco. ISBN 0062502840.
- Flinders, Carol (1989).The Making of a Teacher: Conversations with Eknath Easwaran.

== See also ==
- List of American print journalists
- List of vegan and plant-based media
