= Nandita Shah =

Indian homeopath and author

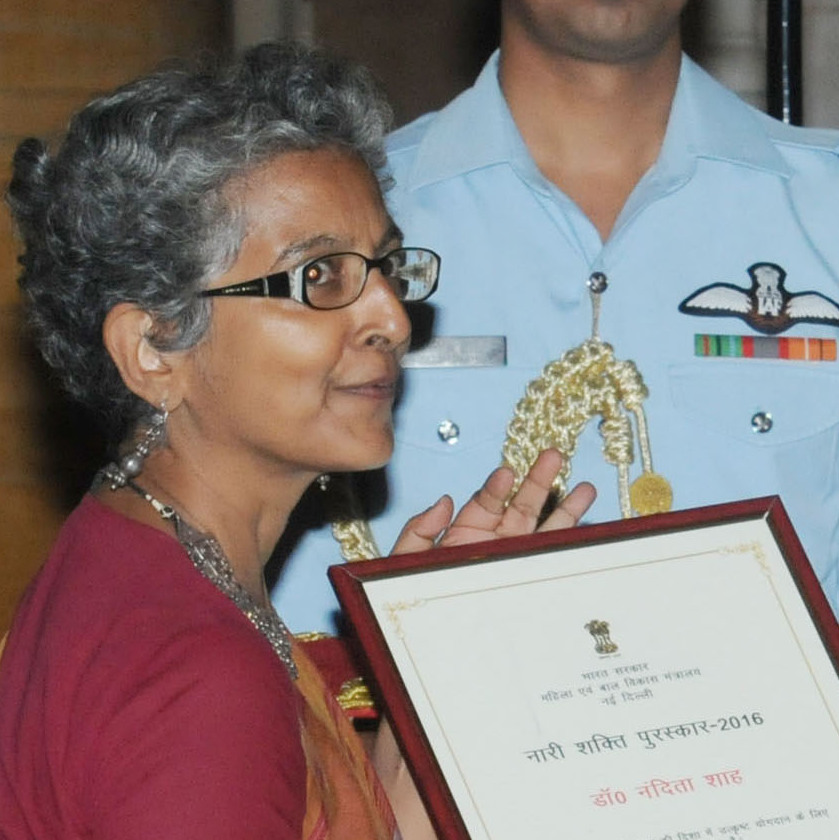
- Nandita Shah receives the Nari Shakti Puraskar
- Born: 15 February 1959 (age 67); Mumbai
- Occupation: Homeopath
- Years active: 1981–
- Known for: SHARAN
- Notable work: Reversing Diabetes in 21 Days

Nandita Shah (born 1959) is an Indian homeopath and author. She began her health practice in 1981 and founded the non-governmental organization Sanctuary for Health and Reconnection to Animals and Nature (SHARAN) in 2005. In 2016, she received the Nari Shakti Puraskar.

== Early life ==
Nandita Shah was born on 15 February 1959 in Mumbai. She qualified as a medical doctor specializing in homeopathy from CMP Homeopathic Medical College in Mumbai and has been practicing since 1981. Shah has been vegan since 1985. She worked at Farm Sanctuary, an animal shelter in Watkins Glen, New York, as an intern before moving to Auroville in 1999.

== Career ==
In 2005, Shah founded the non-governmental organization Sanctuary for Health and Reconnection to Animals and Nature (SHARAN) to promote healthy eating. She believes that a vegan diet and consuming raw foods can prevent issues such as depression, diabetes, hypertension, and heart disease. During the COVID-19 pandemic in India, SHARAN offered free online cooking workshops.

Shah was one of four women from Tamil Nadu to receive the 2016 Nari Shakti Puraskar, presented in New Delhi by the President of India, Pranab Mukherjee, at Rashtrapati Bhavan. Shah is the author of the book Reversing Diabetes in 21 Days. She believes that the proteins in milk can be a cause of diabetes. As of 2020, she was living in Auroville.
