= Rachel Ama =

Chef and cookbook writer

- Born: 1991 (age 34–35); Crouch End, London, England
- Children: 1

YouTube information
- Channel: Rachel Ama
- Years active: 2017–present
- Subscribers: 700 thousand
- Website: www.rachelama.com

Rachel Ama (born 1991) is an English vegan chef, cookbook writer and Internet personality. She was named a 2019 rising star of the food scene by The Observer.

== Early life ==
Ama was born at her family's home in North London to a Saint Lucian father and a half Sierra Leonean, half Welsh mother, Tiffa Easmon-George. She went to university. She started eating vegan in her early 20s.

== Career ==
Ama began uploading YouTube videos in summer 2017, starting with vegan versions of Caribbean dishes. In 2018, she presented a BBC Radio 4 programme on vegan Caribbean cuisine. By 2019, Ama's YouTube channel had gained over 250 thousand subscribers and over 400 thousand by 2020. As of 2024, she has over 700 thousand subscribers.

Via Ebury Publishing, Ama published her debut cookbook Rachel Ama's Vegan Eats in 2019. Rachel Ama's Vegan Eats was awarded Best Vegan Cookbook by PETA UK. It was also shortlisted for a Publishers' Publicity Circle (PPC) Award, and Ama featured at the Balham Literary Festival. In addition, Ama created a temporary collaborative menu for By Chloe.

Ama signed with Yellow Kite (a Hodder & Stoughton imprint) for the publication of her second cookbook One Pot: Three Ways in 2021.

In 2023, Ama created a meal plan with AllPlants.

== Personal life ==
Ama resides in North London with her mother and pet dog. She has a son.

== Bibliography ==
- Rachel Ama's Vegan Eats (2019)
- One Pot: Three Ways (2021)
- Rachel Ama's Family Recipes (2024) (e-book)
