= Milked (film) =

2021 New Zealand documentary

- Directed by: Amy Taylor
- Produced by: Amy Taylor; Chris Huriwai
- Starring: Chris Huriwai
- Release date: October 31, 2021
- Running time: 90 minutes
- Country: New Zealand
- Language: English

Milked is a 2021 New Zealand documentary about the dairy industry following the activist Chris Huriwai.

The documentary features Jane Goodall, Suzy Amis Cameron, and Keegan Kuhn. It was directed and produced by Amy Taylor and co-produced by Huriwai. Its executive producers were Kuhn, Cameron, Peter Eastwood, Moby, Jaine Rao, Sailesh Rao, and Jerome Boudot.
