= Shakuntala Majumdar =

Indian animal rights activist (born 1964)

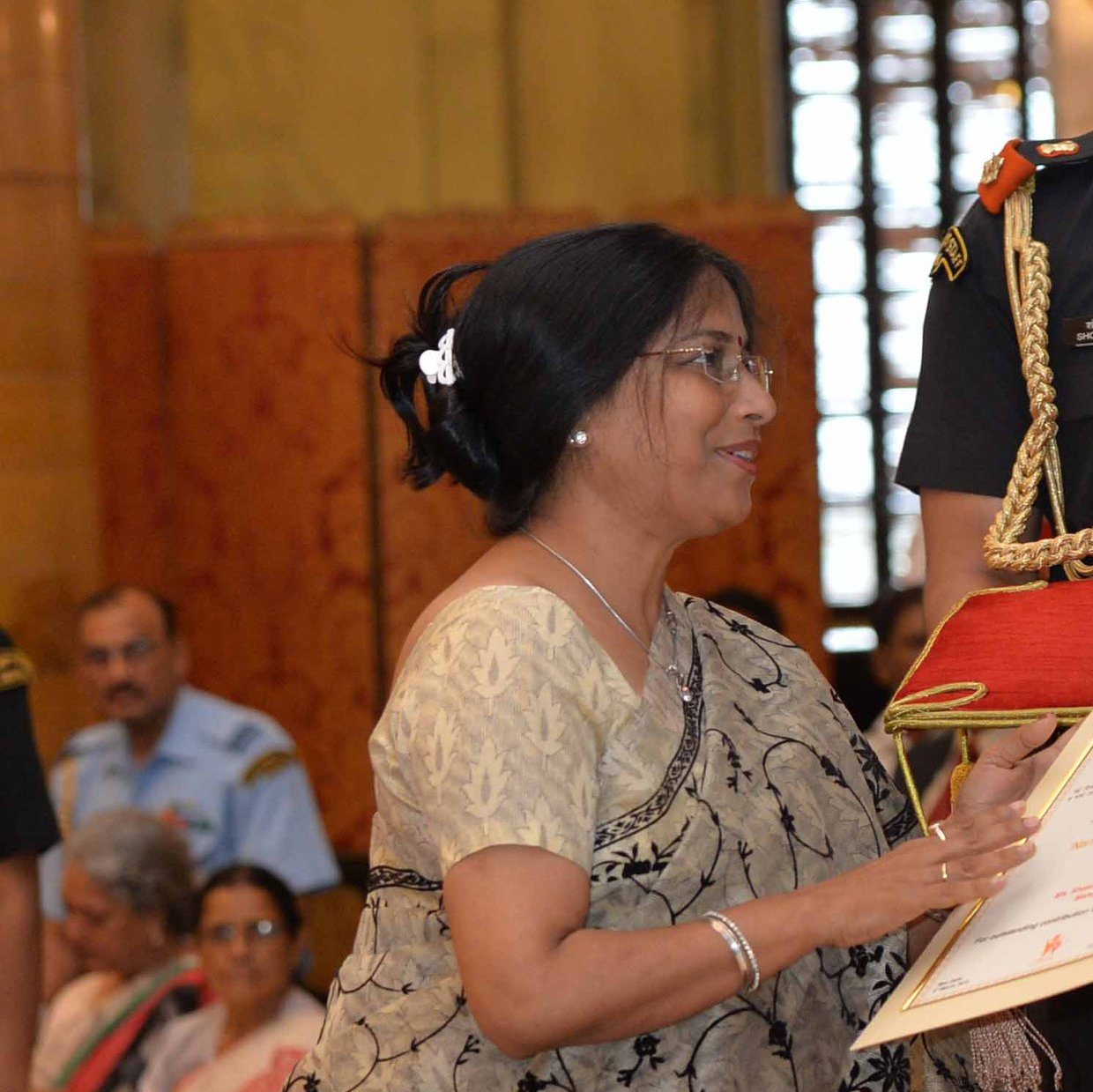
- Born: c.1964
- Occupation: animal rights activist

Shakuntala Majumdar (born 1964) is an Indian animal rights activist who was awarded the Nari Shakti Puraskar for her work for the Society for Protection of Cruelty to Animals in Thane.

== Life ==
She was born in about 1964.

In 2002 Majumdar and six others formed the Society for Protection of Cruelty to Animals (SPCA) branch in Thane.

In 2016 Majumdar was chosen to receive the Nari Shakti Puraskar on International Women's Day. The award was made by the President of India, Pranab Mukherjee, at the Presidential palace in New Delhi. Another fourteen women and seven institutions were honoured that day.

In 2017 she and Thane SPCA were in dispute with local authorities over two stray dogs. The authorities wanted the dogs to be removed from the streets as they were behaving aggressively and they were intimidating some citizens. Majumdar offered to pick the dogs up and to give them a medical check, but when they were well she said that they would be returned to the street. The dispute over the rights involved continued. Majumdar was not even sure if she had the legal power to remove stray dogs as she believed that the supreme court had said that stray dogs have rights. She could arrange for the dogs to be picked up and sterilised but they would then be released back to their original haunts.

During the early weeks of the coronavirus pandemic in February 2020, posters appeared encouraging people to avoid touching stray animals for fear that this might spread the virus. She and Maneka Gandhi were asking for the posters to be removed. They reiterated the advice from the World Health Organization that this fear was unfounded. Later she and the SPCA group took on the role of organising the welfare of horses. The horses were used to give tourists rides but the lockdown meant that these unlicensed horses were not taking any money. Without any income the owners could not feed them and the SPCA helped.
