= Live and Let Die =

Live and Let Die may refer to:

== James Bond ==
- Live and Let Die (novel), a 1954 novel by Ian Fleming
  - Live and Let Die (film), a 1973 film starring Roger Moore
    - Live and Let Die (video game), a video game
    - Live and Let Die (soundtrack)
    - "Live and Let Die" (song), a song by Paul McCartney and Wings from the film
  - Live and Let Die (adventure), a 1984 module for the James Bond 007 role-playing game

== Music ==
- Live and Let Die (album), an album by Kool G Rap & DJ Polo

== Television ==
- "Live and Let Die", 26 Men season 2, episode 27 (1958)
- "Live and Let Die", ALF season 4, episode 9 (1989)
- "Live and Let Die", Constellation episode 2 (2024)
- "Live and Let Die", CSI: NY season 2, episode 18 (2006)
- "Live and Let Die", Holby City series 7, episode 16 (2005)
- "Live and Let Die", Karoline Kamakshi episode 7 (2019)
- "Live and Let Die", The Originals season 2, episode 4 (2014)
- "Live and Let Die", The Way Home season 3, episode 3 (2025)

== See also ==
- Live or Let Die (disambiguation)
- Live and Let Live (disambiguation)
