= Sentience Politics =

Swiss anti-speciesist think tank

- Nickname: Sentience
- Formation: 2013; 13 years ago
- Purpose: Reducing suffering of non-human animals
- Location: Basel, Switzerland
- Region served: Switzerland
- Official language: German; French
- President: Naoki Peter
- Co-Managing Directors: Bettina Huber; Naomi Rey
- Website: sentience.ch/en

Sentience Politics is a Swiss anti-speciesist political organization with the goal of reducing the suffering of non-human animals. Founded in 2013, their activities include political campaigns, such as ballot initiatives for sustainable food, fundamental rights for primates and a ban on factory farming.

== History ==
Sentience Politics was established as a project of the Effective Altruism Foundation, whose other projects include Raising for Effective Giving and the Foundational Research Institute. The project used to conduct research on how to most effectively reduce the suffering of human and non-human sentient beings. This work is now being done by the independent Sentience Institute, which was founded in 2017 while Sentience Politics continues to do primarily political work.

Sentience Politics has been operating as an independent Swiss association since 2017.

== Positions ==
=== Cultured meat ===
Sentience Politics advocates for the use of cultured meat to meet animal welfare, environmental sustainability, and human health challenges, arguing that cultured meat inflicts significantly less pain on animals, has significantly lower land and water use and is healthier during production and consumption. To promote the use of cultured meat Sentience Politics advocates for private and public funding of academic research and increasing awareness of the possibilities of cultured meat.

=== Fundamental rights for primates ===
Sentience Politics considers humans one of many primate species and advocates to treat equal things equally while treating unequal things different based on the existing differences. The think tank describes non-human primates as highly intelligent, social beings, that can experience pain, remember past events, plan future events and have a fundamental interest to live and remain unharmed. Following this position Sentience Politics argues that non-human primates are equally deserving of the right to experience no harm and not being killed as human primates.

=== Sustainable Food ===
Sentience Politics considers the animal industry to be a driver of environmental problems through greenhouse gas emissions and water pollution, world poverty through water shortage, price increase for staple foods, displacement of local farmers and food waste, Swiss food insecurity through high land use, health issues through antibiotic resistance, pandemic, cardiovascular disease, diabetes and obesity risks, and animal welfare through slaughtering, cannibalism and behavioral disorders. To address these shortcomings Sentience Politics advocates for promoting plant-based cooking skills, increasing the range of plant-based product offers, and solidifying the basis of decision-making through recommendations and research.

== Campaigns ==
=== Fundamental rights for primates ===
In June 2016, Sentience Politics began collecting signatures for a ballot initiative on fundamental rights for primates in Basel, Switzerland. With the submission of 3,080 valid signatures to the Basel State Chancellery, the initiative was officially handed in on September 16, 2017. The proposed reforms would revise the cantonal constitution to include a "right to life and respect for the physical and mental integrity" for non-human primates. According to Sentience Politics, Basel's existing animal welfare regulations are not sufficient to protect primates from death and suffering, for example in pharmaceutical experiments and in confinement at the Basel Zoo. If adopted, the reform would have allowed observational studies on primates but very few medical experiments, and would require the Basel Zoo to make significant changes in its primate breeding and enclosures. According to Sentience Politics' former Managing Director Meret Schneider, the campaign is a first step in extending rights to non-human animals.

The initiative was initially declared invalid by the Basel parliament because, as per their assessment, it violated higher-level law. The Basel Court of Appeal and, in second instance, the Federal Supreme Court, however, came to a different conclusion.

The campaign was supported by Basel's Green and Social Democratic Party. English primatologist Jane Goodall was the most prominent individual to support the proposal.

The proposal was voted on by Basel's electorate on February 13, 2022, and rejected with 25.3% in favour of the constitutional amendment. It was the first time in history that a region voted on fundamental rights for non-human animals.

=== Sustainable food ===
On October 10, 2016, Sentience Politics, along with animal advocacy organizations Vebu and the Albert Schweitzer Foundation for Our Contemporaries began collecting signatures for a citizen’s initiative in Berlin Kreuzberg that would require all schools and the town hall to offer a vegan option every day. This was the first vegan citizen’s initiative in Germany. They needed to collect signatures from 3% of the electorate (about 6,000) by April 2017. At the time, there were about 95,000 vegans in Berlin, and the city had been considered the vegan capital of Europe with more than 50 vegan restaurants.

Sentience Politics has launched similar initiatives in Zurich, Basel and Lucerne, Switzerland.

Sentience Politics explained to House of Democracy and Human Rights that the vegan options will help mitigate climate change. The initiative will also help reduce the suffering of farmed animals. There has been resistance from cafeteria directors, who fear that the vegan options would cost more. The District Office estimates that a vegan meal would cost 1.25 Euro more than a conventional meal.

=== Initiative to ban factory farming in Switzerland ===
In 2018, Sentience Politics started gathering signatures for a people's initiative to ban factory farming in Switzerland. In September 2019, the initiative committee submitted more than 100,000 verified signatures in the Swiss capital of Bern. Initially, the Swiss Federal Council announced that they will present a direct counter proposal to the initiative. In March 2022 the Council of States followed the National Council's assessment and decided not to prepare a counter proposal to be voted on. The initiative was rejected in September 2022 despite receiving over one million YES votes.

== See also ==
- Animal consciousness
- Effective altruism
- Nonhuman Rights Project
- Timeline of animal welfare and rights
