= Live and Let Live (2013 film) =

- Directed by: Marc Pierschel
- Written by: Marc Pierschel
- Produced by: Marc Pierschel
- Music by: Cars and Trains
- Distributed by: Syndicado
- Release dates: 3 November 2013 (Cinema & Kurbelkiste Münster)
- Running time: 80 minutes
- Country: Germany
- Language: English

Live and Let Live is a 2013 documentary film by German filmmaker and director Marc Pierschel. The film follows several vegan activists and interviews vegan proponents. The documentary explores the reasons for adopting veganism and how people live according to this lifestyle.

== Synopsis ==
The documentary film examines the relationship that humans have with animal by following six different individuals who moved to veganism for different reasons. With, for example, a butcher who became a vegan chef, a factory farmer who started a farm sanctuary, a professional athlete who changed his complete diet, and activists for the animal rights movement Animal Equality. Besides the film explores the history of veganism and the ethical, environmental and health reasons why people become vegan by interviewing proponents of the vegan movement.

== Accolades ==
In 2014 the movie was screened, among other places, at the 19th Milano Film Festival, Tage des unabhängigen Films in Augsburg and the Utopianale Filmfestival in Hannover. It became an official selection of Crossroads Film Festival, and was nominated for a 'Cosmic Angel' at the Cosmic Cine Film Festival.

== Appearances ==
The documentary stars the notable appearance of Jonathan Balcombe (ethologist and biologist); T. Colin Campbell (professor of nutritional biochemistry and writer of The China Study); Melanie Joy (sociologist and psychologist, on the ideology of carnism); Will Potter (journalist and author of Green Is The New Red); Peter Singer (professor of bioethics); Tom Regan (distinguished professor of philosophy on animal rights); Gary Francione (distinguished professor of law on 'abolitionism'); George Rodger (chair of The Vegan Society); and Jack Lindquist (professional track cyclist and vegan).

== See also ==
- List of vegan and plant-based media
