= Joan Dunayer =

American animal rights advocate and writer

- Occupation: Philosopher
- Known for: Animal equality, anti-speciesism
- Notable work: Animal Equality: Language and Liberation (2001), Speciesism (2004)

Joan Dunayer is an American philosopher and abolitionist animal rights advocate. She is the author of two books, Animal Equality (2001) and Speciesism (2004). She has argued for "species equality" the view that all animals, including insects, should be given rights.

Dunayer graduated from Princeton University and has master's degrees in English literature, education, and psychology. She became a vegan in 1989.

== Animal rights ==
Dunayer is an advocate of abolitionist animal rights. She has been described as "one of the most radical champions of animal rights and abolitionism of all forms of animal slavery". She firmly opposes speciesism and what she terms "new speciesists", those who pretend to be antispeciesist but still elevate human interests over nonhumans. She categorizes Peter Singer, Tom Regan and Gary L. Francione as "new speciesists" as they privilege humans over nonhumans.

She defends radical egalitarianism that rejects any attempt to compare moral values among different species. In Dunayer's philosophical system, a mouse's life is equal to that of a human. Her views have been criticized as problematic and impractical in real life. Philosopher Steven Best has commented that "Dunayer's radical approach leads her into numerous inconsistencies and hypocrisies. She admits, for instance, that she would kill a bear in self-defense to preserve her own existence", but this hypothetical action is "inconsistent with her radical egalitarianism, for she is assuming that her life is more important than the life of a bear who needs food."

Dunayer's view that rights should be extended to insects are rejected by other abolitionists in the animal rights movement.

== Selected works ==
=== Books ===
- Animal Equality: Language and Liberation (Derwood, MD: Ryce Publishing, 2001).
- Speciesism (Derwood, MD: Ryce Publishing, 2004).

=== Book chapters ===
“Mixed Messages: Opinion Pieces by Representatives of US Nonhuman-Advocacy Organizations,” in Critical Animal and Media Studies: Communication for Nonhuman Animal Advocacy, ed. Núria Almiron, Matthew Cole, and Carrie P. Freeman (New York: Routledge, 2016), 91-106.

“The Rights of Sentient Beings: Moving Beyond Old and New Speciesism,” in The Politics of Species: Reshaping Our Relationships with Other Animals, ed. Raymond Corbey and Annette Lanjouw (Cambridge, UK: Cambridge University Press, 2013), 27–39.

“Sexist Words, Speciesist Roots,” in Animals and Women: Feminist Theoretical Explorations, ed. Carol J. Adams and Josephine Donovan (Durham, NC: Duke University Press, 1995), 11–31.

=== Articles ===
- "Advancing Animal Rights" Journal of Animal Law (Volume III, 2007)
- "Serving Abuse: Promoting Animal-Derived Food" Satya Magazine (October 2006)
- "Reply to a Self-Proclaimed Speciesist" Vegan Voice (September/November 2005)
- "From Speciesism to Equality" The Vegan (Summer 2005)
- "Animal Rights "Welfarists": An Oxymoron" Satya Magazine (March 2005)
- "English and Speciesism" English Today (Vol. 19, No. 1, 2003)
- "Animal Equality" Speech at Animal Rights Vienna conference in Austria (September 2002)
- "On Speciesist Language" On The Issues Magazine (Winter 1990)

== See also ==
- List of animal rights advocates
