= Jacy Reese Anthis =

American social scientist and writer

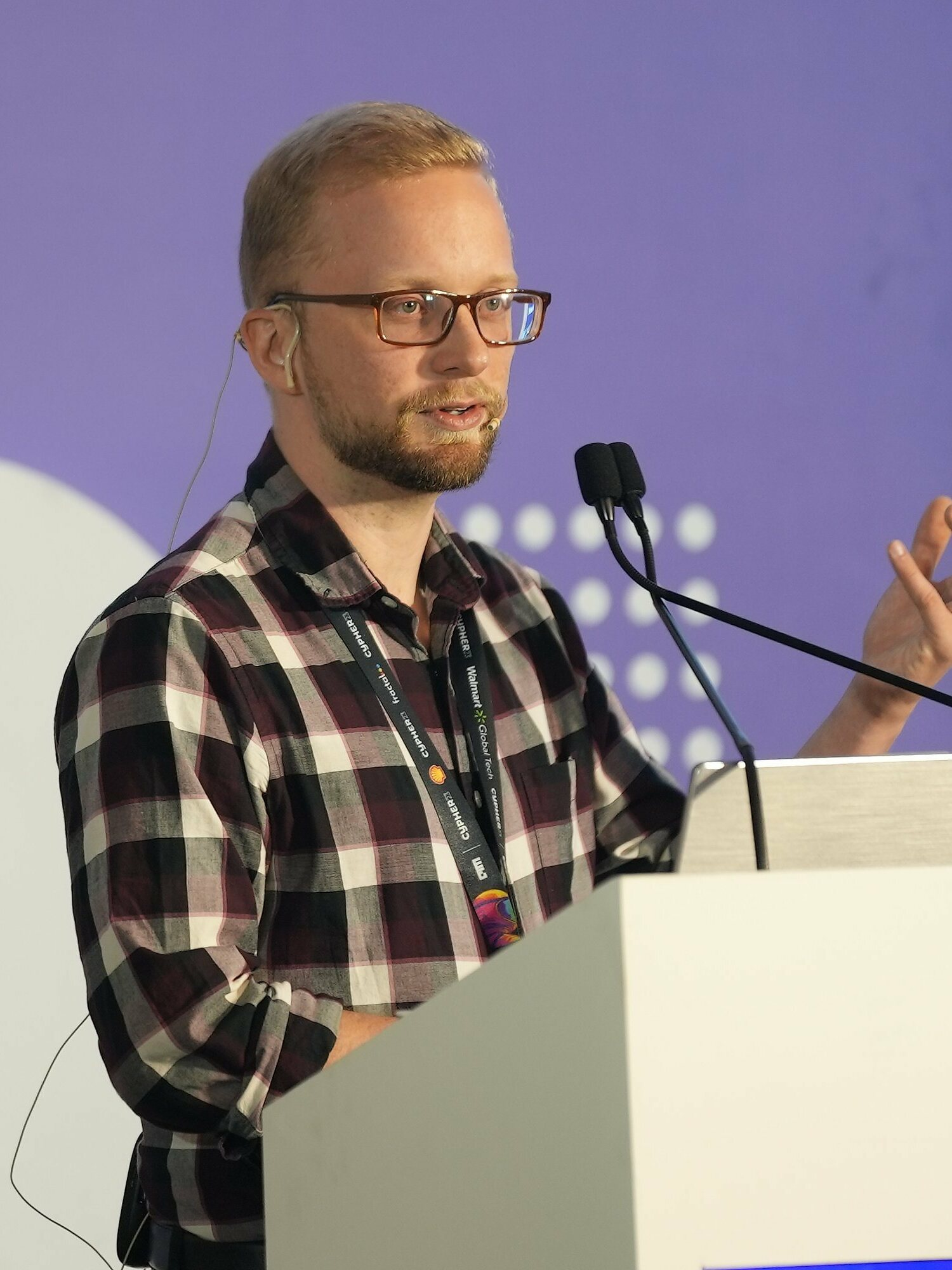
- Anthis in 2023
- Born: December 16, 1992 (age 33); Huntsville, Texas, U.S.
- Education: University of Texas at Austin (Bachelor of Arts and Science in Neuroscience, 2015)
- Occupations: Social scientist, writer
- Spouse: Kelly Witwicki (m. 2020)
- Website: jacyanthis.com

Jacy Reese Anthis (/ˈdʒeɪsi ˈriːs/ JAY-see REESS; born December 16, 1992) is an American social scientist and writer who is co-founder of the Sentience Institute with Kelly Witwicki. He previously worked as a Senior Fellow at Sentience Politics, at Animal Charity Evaluators as chair of the board of directors, and as a full-time researcher.

Anthis's research focuses on effective altruism, anti-speciesism, digital minds, and plant-based and cellular agriculture. He was recognized as one of Vice's "Humans of the Year" in December 2017, along with Witwicki. His 2018 book, The End of Animal Farming speculates that animal farming will end by 2100.

== Education ==
Anthis attended the University of Texas at Austin, graduating with a Bachelor of Arts and Science in neuroscience in 2015. In 2020, he enrolled in the PhD program in sociology at the University of Chicago where he did research on human-AI interactions and machine learning.

== Career ==
Before finishing his undergraduate degree, Anthis worked on the Animal Charity Evaluators (ACE) Board of Directors; he joined them as a full-time researcher after graduation. ACE is an organization within the effective altruism movement that evaluates and compares animal charities based on their cost-effectiveness and transparency, particularly those that are tackling factory farming. While at ACE, Anthis published an article that addressed the issue of wild animal suffering, arguing that humans should act on behalf of wild animals to alleviate their suffering if it can be done safely and effectively. His 2015 Vox article on the topic was criticized by writers who argued that humanity should not intervene or should instead focus on helping domestic animals.

After a year and a half at Animal Charity Evaluators, Anthis briefly worked with Sentience Politics, a project of the Effective Altruism Foundation. Sentience Politics then split into two organizations, one of which was the Sentience Institute, co-founded by Anthis and Kelly Witwicki in June 2017.

== Research and writing ==
In The End of Animal Farming, Anthis "outlines an evidence-based roadmap to a humane, ethical, efficient food system where slaughterhouses are obsolete". Anthis wrote this book from the perspective of effective altruism because there is already much content explaining the problems of animal agriculture, but he perceived a need for a book to guide the "farmed animal movement" towards its long-term goal. Near the end of the book, Anthis concludes that, "if I had to speculate, I would say by 2100 all forms of animal farming will seem outdated and barbaric."

Anthis and the Sentience institute have more recently been conducting research on digital minds, which he defines as artificial entities with mental faculties. He wrote an article on The Hill asking for an artificial intelligence rights movement.

== Publications ==
- (2018). The End of Animal Farming: How Scientists, Entrepreneurs, and Activists Are Building an Animal-Free Food System. Boston: Beacon Press ISBN 9780807019450
