= The lamb and lion =

Artistic and symbolic device, most generally related to peace

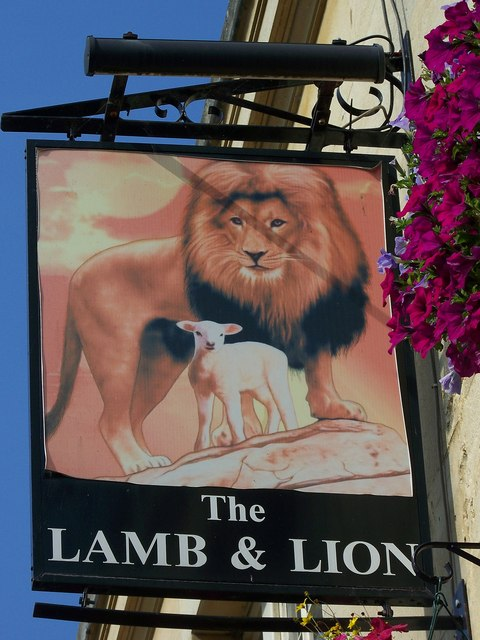
The lamb and the lion as they appear on a pub signboard in Bath, England

"The lamb with the lion" – often a paraphrase from Isaiah, and more closely quoted as "the lion and lamb", "a child will lead them", and the like – are an artistic and symbolic device, most generally related to peace.

The symbol is used in both Christianity and Judaism to represent the Messianic Age. In addition, in Christianity, according to a sermon by Augustine, the lion stands for Christ resurrected, the lamb for Christ's sacrifice ("He endured death as a lamb; he devoured it as a lion."—Augustine, Sermon 375A).

Isaiah 35:9 casts a lion as metaphorically forbidden in the future paradise ("No lion shall be there, nor any ravenous beast shall go up thereon, it shall not be found there; but the redeemed shall walk there"); yet, Isaiah 65:25 and Isaiah 11:6–7, respectively reference such formerly ravenous beasts as becoming peaceable: "The wolf and the lamb shall feed together, the lion shall eat straw like the ox; but the serpent—its food shall be dust!"; "The wolf shall live with the lamb, the leopard shall lie down with the kid, the calf and the lion and the fatling together, and a little child shall lead them."

"In like a lion, out like a lamb" is a proverb having to do with March weather. It has been speculated that its origin is from astrological Leo (lion) being followed by Aries (ram).

== Examples ==
In the 1830s, American Quaker artist Edward Hicks began painting a series of paintings on the theme of the Peaceable Kingdom.

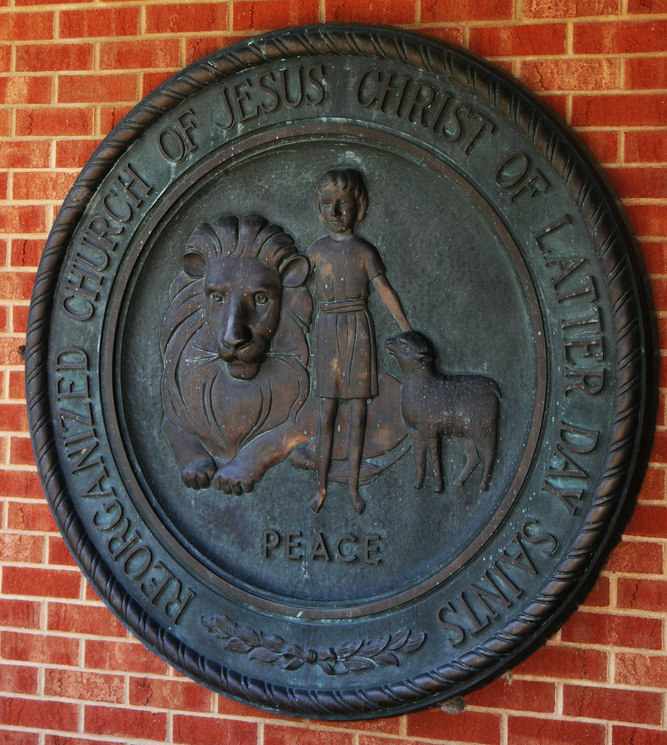
Seal of the Community of Christ (c. 1950s; since the 1960s it has been simplified, e.g., braiding around circumference removed)

The kingdom-of-peace motif has been popular among various so-called Christian "Restorationist" groups. The lamb and lion have been used informally in Community of Christ since the Latter Day Saints' "Kirtland" period. (Note: The Latter Day Saint movement's founder, Joseph Smith, Jr. (Joseph Smith III's father), related during the Zion's Camp expedition: "In pitching my tent we found three massasaugas or prairie rattlesnakes, which the brethren were about to kill, but I said, Let them alone – don't hurt them! How will the serpent ever lose his venom, while the servants of God possess the same disposition, and continue to make war upon it? Men must become harmless, before the brute creation; and when men lose their vicious dispositions and cease to destroy the animal race, the lion and the lamb can dwell together, and the sucking child can play with the serpent in safety." —Joseph Smith, Jr., 1834) Its original formal iteration, prominently featuring the lion, the lamb, and child, along with the motto Peace, was designed by Joseph Smith III, Jason W. Briggs, and Elijah Banta, and approved in the denomination's General Conference in 1874. The Worldwide Church of God (now Grace Communion International) had used a seal depicting the lamb, the lion and a child.

A number of "peace" gardens or fountains at Jewish, Catholic, and Protestant places of worship contain statuary containing the lamb and lion. In 1987, the Lion & Lamb Peace Arts Center was established at Mennonite Bluffton University.

Humorist Josh Billings (1818–1885): "The lion and the lamb may possibly sometimes lie down together; but if you'll notice carefully, when the lion gets up, the lamb is generally missing." Attributed to Woody Allen: "I've always liked, someday the lamb will lay by the lion ... but it won't get much sleep."

== Gallery ==
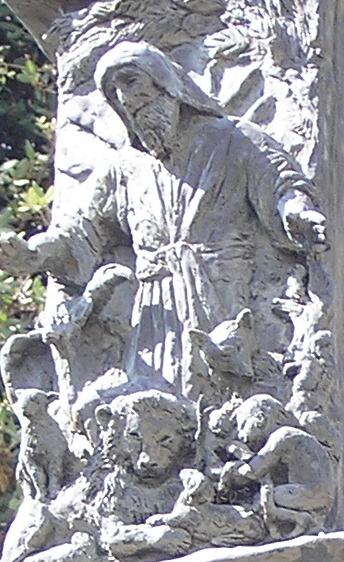
Part of the Knesset Menorah includes relief of a lamb, lion, various other animals, and a little child under a representation of Isaiah.

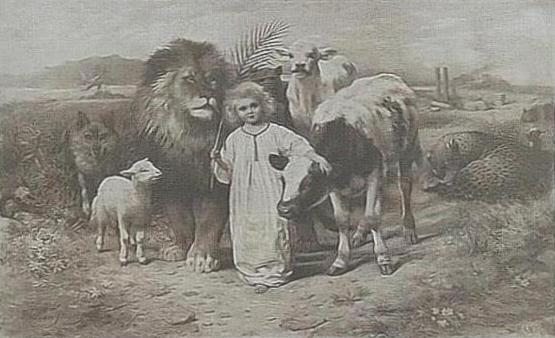
"Peace," etching by the Australian artist William Strutt, 1896

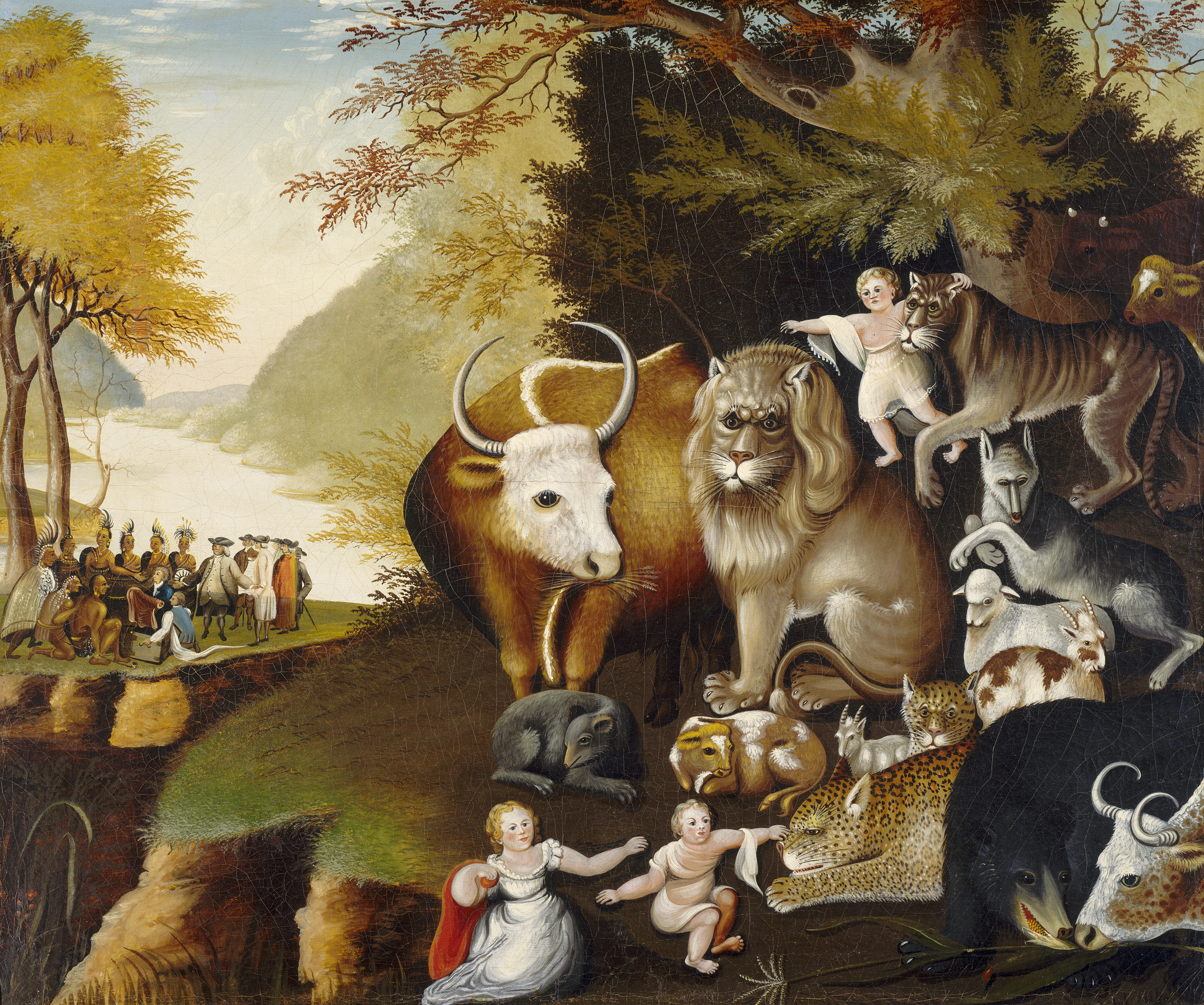
Edward Hicks, "Peaceable Kingdom," c. 1834

== See also ==
- Peaceable Kingdom
- The Wolf and the Lamb
- Hosanna to God and the Lamb
- Snake handling
- Coat of arms of the London Borough of Barnet
