= Coat of arms of the London Borough of Barnet =

- Armiger: London Borough of Barnet
- Adopted: 1 January 1965
- Crest: On a Wreath of the Colours in front of a two bladed Airscrew in pale winged and issuant Or two Swords in saltire points upward proper.
- Shield: Azure on a Mount in base Vert a Pascal Lamb proper on a Chief per pale Agent and Gules a Saxon Crown Or between two Roses counterchanged barbed and seeded proper.
- Supporters: On the dexter side a Lion and on the sinister a Stag Argent each charged on the shoulder with a Cross potent quadrate Gules.
- Motto: 'UNITAS EFFICIT MINISTERIUM' (Unity Accomplishes Service)

The coat of arms of the London Borough of Barnet is the official coat of arms of the London Borough of Barnet. It was granted on 1 January 1965.

== Design ==
Coats of Arms of the former localities of Hendon (top) and East Barnet (bottom)

The arms are largely based on those of Hendon, with additions for other towns merged with it. The lamb, blazoned as a "pascal lamb", in the arms carries a cross standard. The lamb as standing on a hill on a blue field is taken directly from the arms of Hendon, where it symbolises the origin of the name Hendon, 'at the high down'. This was used by Hendon since the formation of a local board for the town in 1879. The chief is derived from the arms of East Barnet, where the roses stand for the fighting parties in the battle of Barnet during the War of the Roses. The Saxon crown between the roses is taken from the arms of Middlesex County Council, as a reference to the fact that a large part of this London Borough was once part of that county.

The winged airscrew in the crest, from the crest of the Borough of Hendon, refers to the former borough's links with aviation as the headquarters of the Royal Air Force was situated there. The swords, from the device of the Barnet UDC and the arms of the East Barnet UDC, are a reference to the Battle of Barnet just like the roses in the chief.

The supporters are similar to those which were used by Municipal Borough of Finchley, where they however were of proper colour (in their natural colour) rather than argent (silver). The lion was derived from the Compton family arms, former holders of the Manor of Finchley while the stag symbolised the game once hunted by Tudor monarchs in the forests in this area. The stag can possibly also be seen to refer to the hart supporters in the arms of Hertfordshire County Council; before 1965, the towns of Barnet and East Barnet were situated in Hertfordshire. Both supporters have crosses on them, symbols of the Knights of the Hospital of St. John of Jerusalem, who held the ancient priory in Friern Barnet.

The motto, 'unitas efficit ministerium', is Latin for 'unity accomplishes service'.

== See also ==
- Armorial of London
