= Peaceable Kingdom (film) =

- Directed by: Jenny Stein
- Produced by: James LaVeck
- Starring: Lorri Bauston, Gene Bauston, Harold Brown, Howard Lyman, Jim Mason, Jessi Seif, Peaches Gillete, Jerry Cook
- Release date: 2004
- Running time: 70 minutes
- Country: United States
- Language: English

Peaceable Kingdom, produced in 2004 by Tribe of Heart, is a documentary about several farmers who refuse to kill animals and how they convert to veganism as a way of life.

A newer version of the film premiered in 2009 called Peaceable Kingdom: The Journey Home which featured different people. On the Tribe of Heart website for the 2009 film, there is no apparent mention of the 2004 movie.

== Plot ==
The 2004 film tells the story of how the farmers create an animal sanctuary farm called "Farm Sanctuary" where they rescue injured animals, half dead, abandoned, and rejected by the farm industry for not being productive. A few examples are a cow with mastitis or newborn chicks unfit for production.

== Awards ==
It has won awards such as the Festival Theme Award of the Ojai Film Festival in 2004, with music by Moby. Images of exploitations are shown during the film. According to the primatologist Jane Goodall, "Peaceable Kingdom is a piece of art".

The documentary's producers, James LaVeck and Jenny Stein, have created a website called HumaneMyth.org that explores whether animals can be used humanely for food, advocating that it is generally not possible to do so.

== See also ==
- Animal rights
- List of vegan and plant-based media
