= VegNews =

American magazine

- Publisher: Colleen Holland
- Categories: Vegan lifestyle
- Frequency: 4 editions annually (quarterly)
- Circulation: 240,000
- Founded: 2000
- Company: Fresh Healthy Media
- Country: United States
- Based in: Los Angeles
- Language: English
- Website: vegnews.com
- ISSN: 1544-8495

VegNews is a media brand focused on a plant-based lifestyle, encompassing a flagship magazine, a website, and a podcast, among other properties. VegNews covers content relating to veganism, including news, recipes, and celebrity interviews.

== History and profile ==
VegNews was founded in San Francisco in 2000, and today reaches 5 million readers each month. It has won nearly every major media industry award, including Best Magazine, Magazine of the Decade, Best Website, Best Social Media, and Best Media Company. VegNews is owned by co-founder and publisher Colleen Holland. Richard Bowie is the Editorial Director, Emily Utne is the Creative Director, and Jasmin Singer is Editor at Large.

== Other properties and projects ==
Along with its flagship magazine, website, and social media properties, VegNews produces VeganWeddings.com, HealthyVegan.com, VegNews Vacations, the VegNews Ultimate Vegan Meal Planner, and The VegNews Guide to Being a Fabulous Vegan, published by Hachette Go.

== See also ==
- List of vegan and plant-based media
- List of food and drink magazines
