= Rip Esselstyn =

American health activist (born 1963)

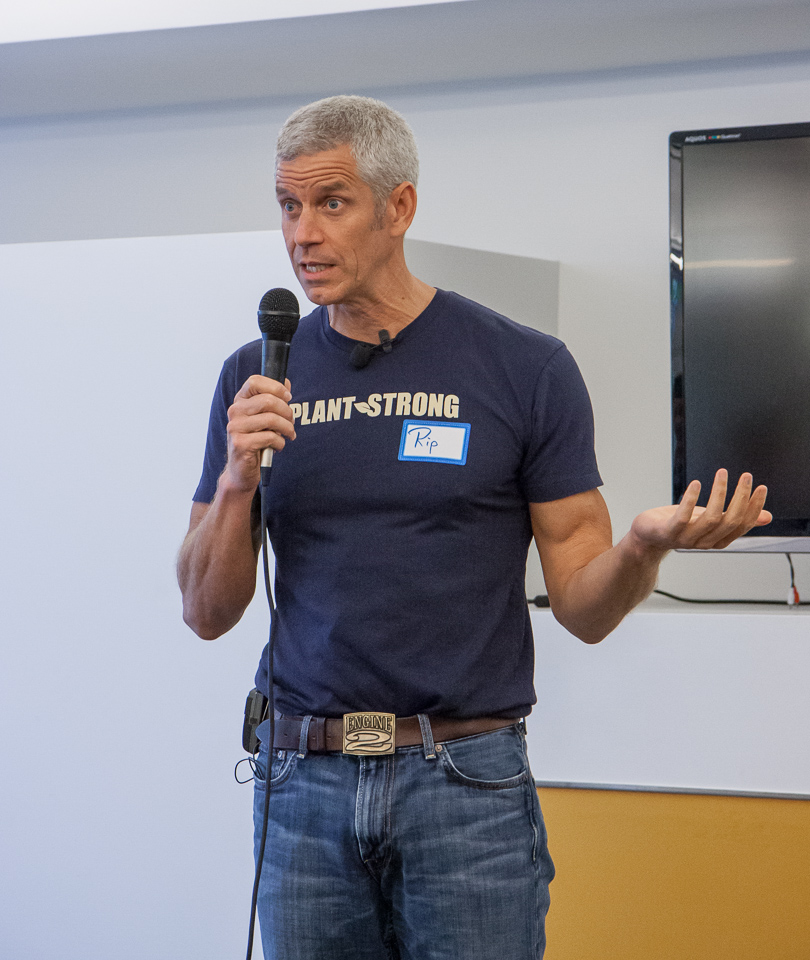
- Esselstyn in June 2013
- Born: February 16, 1963 (age 63); Upstate New York, U.S.
- Education: University of Texas, Austin
- Occupations: Health activist, food writer
- Spouse: Jill Kolasinski
- Children: 3
- Relatives: Caldwell Esselstyn (father); George Crile, Jr. (grandfather); George Washington Crile (great-grandfather); George Crile III (uncle)
- Writing career
- Subjects: Low-fat diets, whole-food diets, plant-based diets
- Website: plantstrong.com

Rip Esselstyn (born February 16, 1963) is an American health activist, food writer, and former firefighter and triathlete. He is an advocate of a low-fat, whole-food, plant-based diet that excludes all animal products and processed foods. He calls it a "plant strong" diet, a term he has trademarked. He is the author of The Engine 2 Diet (2009), My Beef With Meat (2013), Plant-Strong (2016), and The Engine 2 Seven-Day Rescue Diet (2017). Esselstyn is the founder and CEO of PLANTSTRONG, a company focused on whole food, plant-based nutrition and combating the rise of ultra-processed foods.

== Early life ==
Esselstyn was born in Upstate New York on February 16, 1963, the son of Ann and surgeon Caldwell Esselstyn. He was named after Rip Van Winkle. He is the grandson of surgeon George Crile, Jr. and the great-grandson of surgeon George Washington Crile. His father is a former Olympic rowing champion who was one of the early advocates of a whole-food, plant-based diet in the prevention and reversal of heart disease. He has a sister named Jane, a brother Zeb (Caldwell III) (and grew up in Cleveland, Ohio.

Esselstyn graduated from the Mercersburg Academy in 1981. He attended the University of Texas, Austin on a swimming scholarship from 1982 to 1986. During that time, he became an All-American swimmer. After college, he became a triathlete and competed for approximately ten years.

In 1997, he retired as a triathlete and turned his attention towards becoming a firefighter and emergency medical technician, joining Engine 2 of the Austin Fire Department. He retired from firefighting to focus on becoming an advocate for plant-based nutrition.

== Career ==
=== PLANTSTRONG and recent work ===
In 2019, Esselstyn rebranded his Engine 2 business as PLANTSTRONG, expanding into a line of whole-food, plant-based food products, meal planning services, and educational content. The company emphasizes simplicity, accessibility, and avoiding ultra-processed foods. As CEO, Esselstyn has positioned PLANTSTRONG as a voice in the fight against nutritional confusion, advocating for evidence-based, minimally processed diets. He also hosts the PLANTSTRONG Podcast, where he interviews experts in nutrition, lifestyle medicine, and plant-based living.

=== Writing ===
While he grew up eating the standard American diet, Esselstyn switched to a whole-foods plant-based diet in 1987, cutting out meat, fish, eggs and dairy. He was inspired by Dave Scott, who was a vegetarian. Esselstyn describes his approach as "plant-strong", and has trademarked the term. He says he avoids the word "vegan" in case it discourages people, and believes that "plant strong" sounds healthier and more inclusive.

==== The Engine 2 Diet (2009) ====
In 2003, when a co-worker at the Engine 2 fire department discovered that his cholesterol was very high, Esselstyn encouraged the Engine 2 team to switch to a whole foods, plant-based diet to help their colleague. This experience eventually led him to write The Engine 2 Diet, which begins with a foreword by T. Colin Campbell, author of The China Study (2005). The Engine 2 Diet appeared on The New York Times Best Seller list and was endorsed by Chicago Mayor Rahm Emanuel, who made a public appearance with Esselstyn in January 2013. In 2010, Whole Foods Market included The Engine 2 Diet as a "Healthy Eating Partner".

==== My Beef With Meat (2013) ====
In 2013, Esselstyn released another book, My Beef With Meat. It was a New York Times best seller ("Advice, How-To, & Miscellaneous List") that reached the #1 spot for the week of June 2, 2013.

=== Forks Over Knives ===
Esselstyn appeared, along with his father and T. Colin Campbell, in the 2011 American documentary on whole foods, plant-based eating, Forks Over Knives. He later developed and starred in the follow-up documentary, Forks Over Knives Presents: The Engine 2 Kitchen Rescue with Rip Esselstyn.

== Personal life ==
Esselstyn is married to Jill Kolasinski, with whom he has three children.

== Awards ==
- 2001 World Police and Fire Games: first place
- Capital of Texas triathlon: eight-time winner
- Escape from Alcatraz triathlon: six-time winner
- U.S. Masters Swimming: 200 meter backstroke record for men 55–59, set 7/20/2019

== Works ==
Books

- Esselstyn, Rip (May 14, 2013). My Beef with Meat: The Healthiest Argument for Eating a Plant-Strong Diet--Plus 140 New Engine 2 Recipes. Hachette Book Group USA. ISBN 978-1455509362.
- Esselstyn, Rip (February 25, 2009). The Engine 2 Diet: The Texas Firefighter's 28-Day Save-Your-Life Plan that Lowers Cholesterol and Burns Away the Pounds. Hachette Book Group USA. ISBN 978-0446506694. Foreword by T. Colin Campbell.
- Esselstyn, Rip (December 2016). The Engine 2 Seven-Day Rescue Diet. Hachette Book Group USA. ISBN 978-1-4555-9117-6. With recipes by Jane Esselstyn.

DVDs

- Forks Over Knives Presents the Engine 2 Kitchen Rescue with Rip Esselstyn (2011)

== See also ==
- Vegan nutrition
