= George Crile =

George Crile may refer to:

- George Washington Crile (1864–1943), American surgeon
- George Crile Jr. (1907–1992), American surgeon
- George Crile III (1945–2006), American journalist
