= Crile =

Crile may refer to:

- Crile (crater), a lunar crater
- Crile (tool), a type of hemostat
- George Washington Crile (1864–1943), American surgeon
- George Crile, Jr. (1907-1992), American surgeon
- George Crile III (1945–2006), American journalist
- Susan Crile (born 1942), American painter and printmaker
