= Suzanne M. Babich =

American public health scientist (born 1958)

- Born: 1958 (age 67–68)
- Other name: Suzanne Havala Hobbs
- Education: BS in dietetics from Michigan State University MS in nutrition from Winthrop University DrPH in health policy and administration from University of North Carolina at Chapel Hill
- Occupation: Public health scientist

Suzanne Marie Babich (born 1958), formerly Suzanne Havala Hobbs is an American public health scientist, food writer, registered dietitian and vegetarianism activist. She was the primary author for the American Dietetic Association's 1988 and 1993 vegetarian position papers.

== Biography ==
Babich obtained a BS in dietetics from Michigan State University in 1981 and a MS in nutrition from Winthrop University in 1991. She obtained a DrPH in health policy and administration from University of North Carolina at Chapel Hill in 2001.

Babich is an adjunct professor in the Department of Health Policy and Management at Gillings School of Global Public Health. She is Associate Dean of Global Health and Professor of Health Policy and Management at the Richard M. Fairbanks School of Public Health, Indiana University–Purdue University Indianapolis. She is chair of the Board of Accreditation for the European Agency for Public Health Education Accreditation (APHEA).

From 2003 to 2014, Babich wrote a food column "On the Table" in the Raleigh News and Observer and the Charlotte Observer. In total she authored 600 columns.

In 2022, Babich received a U.S. Fulbright Scholar Award to work with colleagues in Croatia at the University of Rijeka.

== Vegetarianism ==
Babich has described herself as a "vegan-leaning, lacto ovo vegetarian for nearly 50 years". She served on the editorial board of the Vegetarian Times magazine for many years and was a nutrition adviser for the Vegetarian Resource Group. Babich was the primary author for the American Dietetic Association's 1988 and 1993 position papers on vegetarian diets with Johanna T. Dwyer. The 1988 position paper questioned the idea of protein combining and concluded it is unnecessary.

In 1990, Babich worked with T. Colin Campbell to help him compile data for the China Health Project. In 1996, Babich attended the 32nd World Vegetarian Congress.

Babich is on the advisory board of the Coalition for Healthy School Food (CHSF), a non-profit organization that introduces plant-based foods and nutrition in schools. A 2nd edition of Babich's Living Vegetarian For Dummies was published in 2022.

== Selected publications ==
- Vegan Diets for Women, Infants, and Children (with Ann Reed Mangels, 1994)
- Vegetarian Diets-Clearing the Air (1994)
- The Vegetarian Food Guide and Nutrition Counter (1997)
- What's Left to Eat?: A Nutritionist Answers Your Questions (1998)
- The Complete Idiot's Guide to Being Vegetarian (1999)
- Get the Trans Fat Out (2006)
- Getting from Fat to Fit: The Role of Policy in the Obesity Disaster (2008)
- Living Vegetarian For Dummies (2009, 2022)
- Living Dairy-Free For Dummies (2010)
