= Esselstyn =

Esselstyn is a surname. Notable people with the surname include:

- Caldwell Esselstyn (born 1933), American physician and author
- Rip Esselstyn (born 1963), American health activist and food writer
