= Caldwell Esselstyn =

American physician (born 1933)

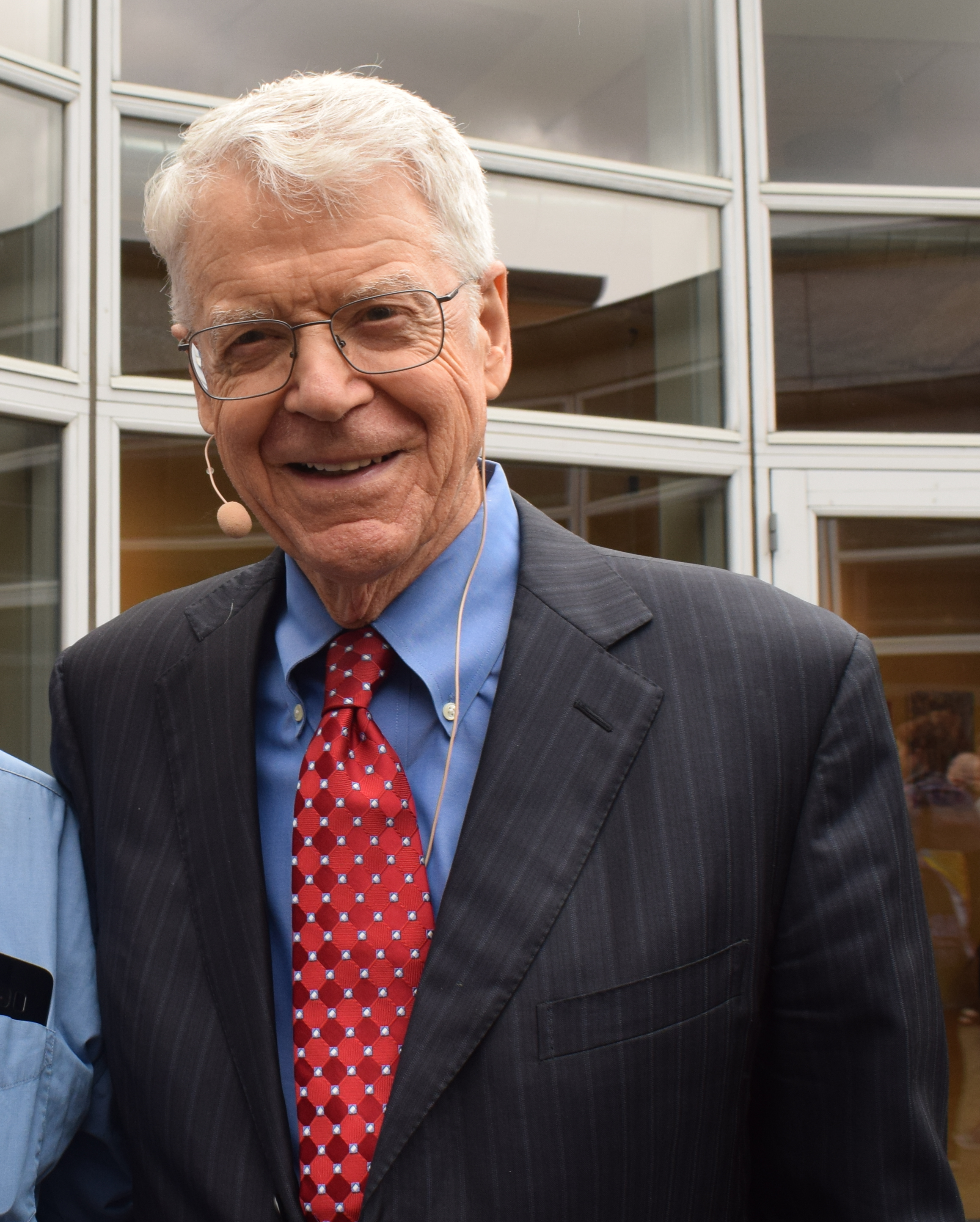
- Esselstyn in May 2019
- Born: December 12, 1933 (age 92); New York City, New York
- Education: Yale University (AB, 1956); Case Western Reserve University School of Medicine (MD, 1961)
- Known for: Forks Over Knives
- Spouse: Ann Crile
- Children: 4, including Rip Esselstyn
- Awards: Gold Medal, 1956 Olympic Games – Men's eight
- Scientific career
- Fields: Cardiology; Plant-based diet
- Workplaces: Cleveland Clinic
- Website: www.dresselstyn.com

Caldwell Esselstyn
Medal record

Men's rowing

Representing the United States

Olympic Games
Gold medal – first place	1956 Melbourne	Men's eight

Caldwell Blakeman Esselstyn Jr. (born December 12, 1933) is an American physician, author and former Olympic rowing champion.

Esselstyn is director of the Heart Disease Reversal Program at the Cleveland Clinic. He is also the author of Prevent and Reverse Heart Disease (2007), in which he argued for an ultra low-fat whole-food, plant-based diet that recommends excluding all animal protein and byproducts.

== Background ==
Esselstyn was born in New York City in 1933 to Dr. Caldwell Blakeman Esselstyn Sr. and Lilian Meyer.

Esselstyn graduated from Yale University in 1956, where he was a member of Skull and Bones. He also competed in the 1956 Summer Olympics in Melbourne, winning a gold medal in the "eights" as a member of the American team.

Esselstyn received his M.D. from the Case Western Reserve University School of Medicine in 1961. During this time he met and married Ann Crile, daughter of surgeon George Crile, Jr, who was a leading figure in the United States in challenging unnecessary surgery, best known for his part in eliminating radical breast surgery and the granddaughter of George Washington Crile, founder of the Cleveland Clinic. Esselstyn was an intern (1961–62) and resident (1962–66) at that clinic. In 1968, he completed a tour as an Army surgeon in Vietnam where he was awarded the Bronze Star. Upon his return he rejoined the clinic and has served as the President of the Staff and as a member of its Board of Governors. He served as the President of the American Association of Endocrine Surgeons in 1991. In 2000, he gave up his post at the Cleveland Clinic.

Esselstyn has served as a member of the Scientific Advisory Board of Nutrition Action magazine, published by the Center for Science in the Public Interest.

He is the father of Rip Esselstyn, who runs PLANTSTRONG and is active in Forks over Knives and other organizations promoting healthy plant-based eating.

== Diet work ==
Esselstyn promotes a whole foods, plant-based diet, arguing it can prevent coronary disease and cardiovascular disease. The diet excludes all animal products and oils and recommends foods such as fruits, vegetables, whole grains, pulses, and especially cruciferous vegetables.

Esselstyn's work received media attention when former U.S. President Bill Clinton cited it, along with work by Dean Ornish and The China Study as the basis for his change of diet in 2010 and yet more in late 2011 when Clinton discussed his diet with CNN and other media outlets.

Esselstyn was also one of the doctors featured in the documentary films Forks Over Knives (2011) and The Game Changers (2018).

With regard to Esselstyn's claims, Nancy Brown, CEO of the American Heart Association, said: "Diet alone is not going to be the reason that heart attacks are eliminated. Other key factors include physical activity, cholesterol, blood pressure and weight."

Harriet A. Hall has written that the claims made by Esselstyn are misleading and that the evidence on which they are based is "pretty skimpy". Steven Nissen of the Cleveland Clinic said that his claims are unproven because there isn't data from rigorous clinical trials to support them.

== Awards ==
In 2005, Esselstyn received the Benjamin Spock Award for Compassion in Medicine (he was the award's first recipient), and in 2009 the Distinguished Alumnus Award from the Cleveland Clinic Alumni Association. In 2010, he received the Greater Cleveland Sports Hall of Fame Award.

== Selected publications ==
- Prevent and Reverse Heart Disease: The Revolutionary, Scientifically Proven, Nutrition-Based Cure. Penguin, 2007 ISBN 978-1-101-21583-8
- The Prevent and Reverse Heart Disease Cookbook: Over 125 Delicious, Life-Changing, Plant-Based Recipes. Penguin, 2014 ISBN 9780698186507

== See also ==
- List of vegans
