= Vegetarian nutrition =

Nutritional and human health aspects of vegetarian diets

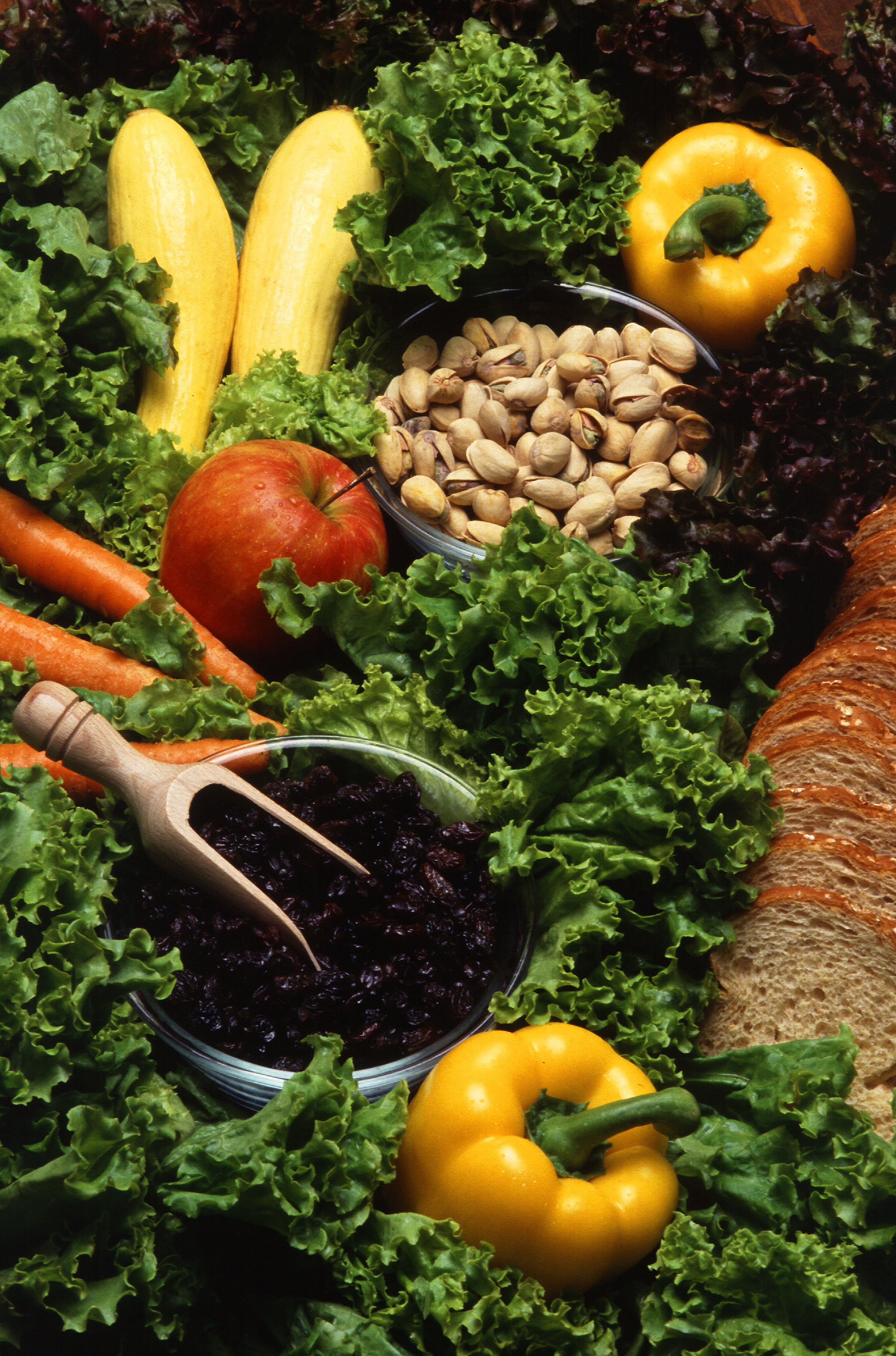
A variety of vegetarian, and more specifically vegan, foods

Vegetarian nutrition is the set of health-related challenges and advantages of vegetarian diets.

Appropriately planned vegetarian diets are healthful and nutritionally adequate for all stages of the human life cycle, including during pregnancy, lactation, infancy, childhood, and adolescence. Vegetarian diets have been proven to prevent certain diseases. However, vegetarian diets deficient in vitamin B_{12} or calories may compromise children's health and development. The UK National Health Service recommends that vegetarian diets should also follow the general recommendations for healthy diets, such as low fat, salt and sugar intakes and 5 fruits or vegetables a day. Qatar's public health ministry states, "One cannot be a healthy vegetarian by going to a fast food restaurant and ordering french fries and soda!".

Vegetarian diets tend to be rich in carbohydrates, omega-6 fatty acids, dietary fibre, carotenoids, folic acid, vitamin C, vitamin E, potassium and magnesium. They are possibly low in saturated fat, cholesterol, and animal protein.

== Critical nutrients ==
=== Protein ===
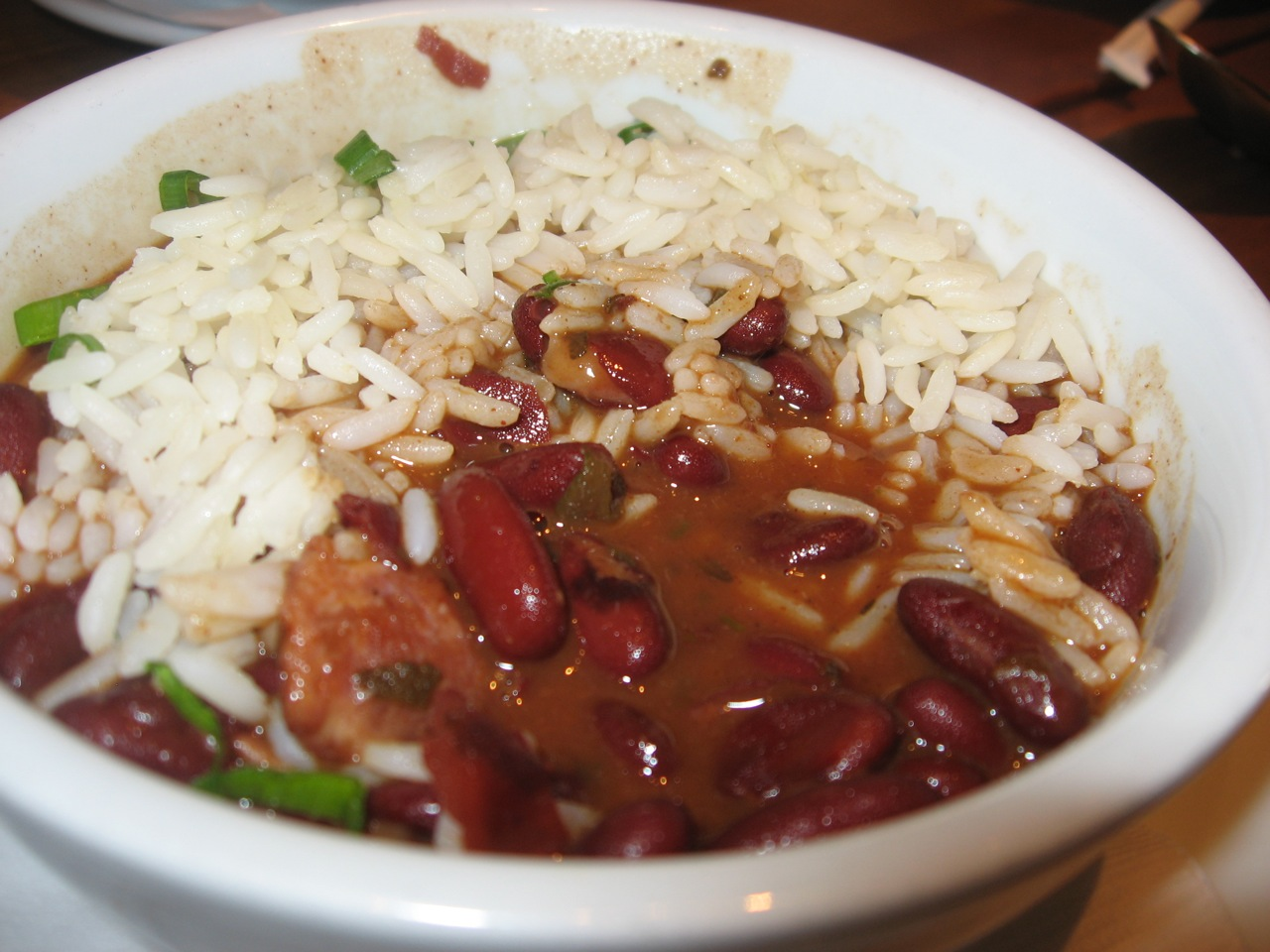
Red beans and rice

Despite the long-standing, widespread belief that vegetarians must consume grains and beans within a short time to make a complete protein that contains all 9 essential amino acids that must be supplied through diet, this has never been substantiated by research. The protein-combining theory was brought to popular attention after being promoted in Frances Moore Lappé's 1971 bestselling book Diet for a Small Planet. In later editions of the book, starting in 1981, Lappé withdrew her contention that protein combining is necessary.

Plant foods rich in protein include soy beans and soy products such as tofu, veggie burgers, and soy milk; other legumes; nuts and seeds; and cereal grains.

=== Vitamin B_{12} ===
Vitamin B_{12} deficiency can be extremely serious and lead to megaloblastic anemia, nerve degeneration and irreversible neurological damage.

Vegetarians may get vitamin B_{12} from eggs and dairy products (milk, cheese, etc.); for some, this is adequate, while others may still remain B_{12}-deficient. More broadly, according to the Academy of Nutrition and Dietetics, even the form of vitamin B_{12} sourced from animal products is protein-bound and not as easily digested as supplements, especially as people age, and therefore B_{12} supplementation is recommended for everyone over the age of 50. Pregnant and lactating vegetarian mothers—and breastfed infants if the vegetarian mother's diet is not supplemented—should also use supplements, whether B_{12}-pills, B_{12}-injections, or B_{12}-fortified foods, if they don't get adequate vitamin B_{12} from animal products like eggs or dairy.

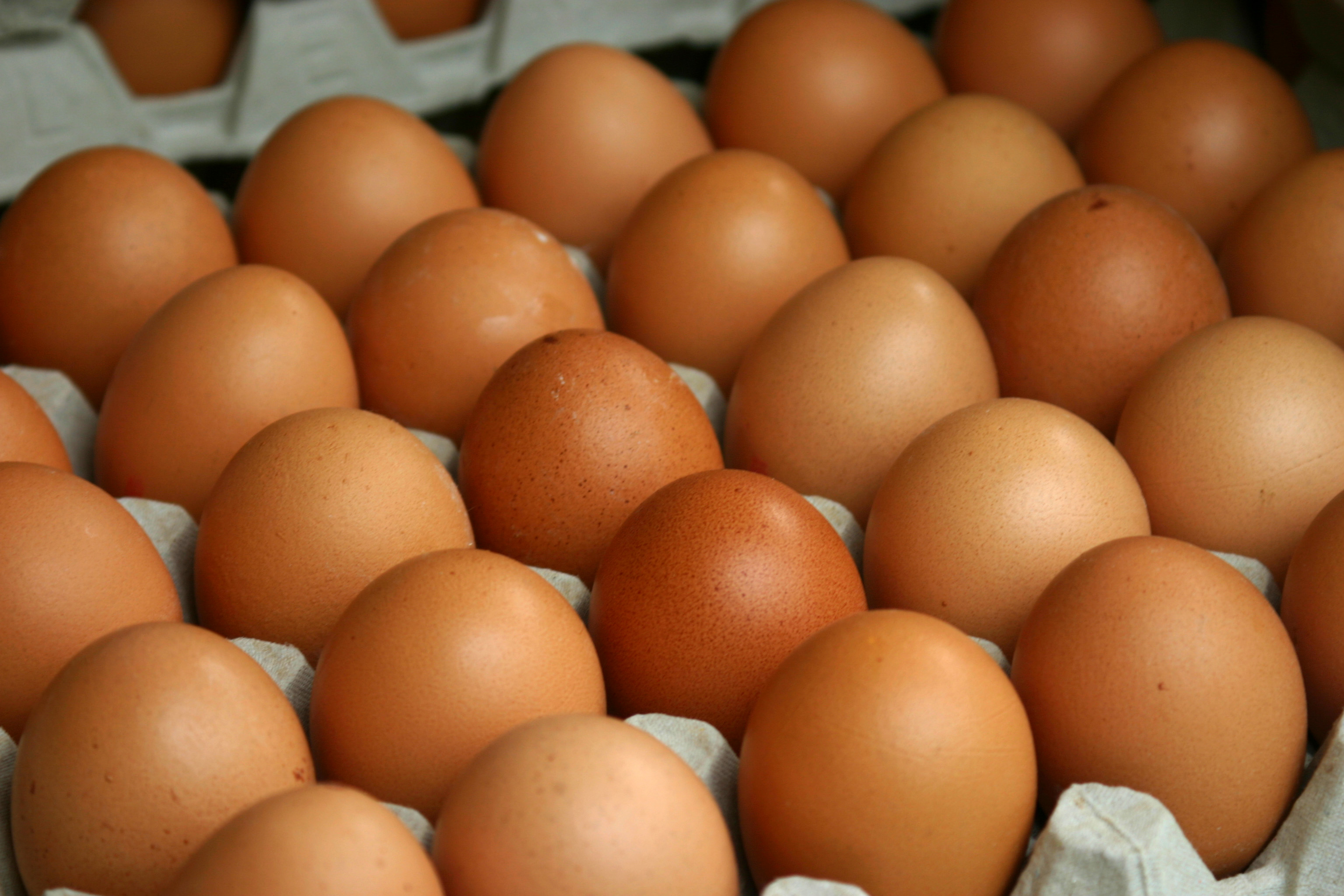
Eggs are a source of vitamin B_{12} for vegetarians.

Generally, humans need 2.4 to 3 micrograms of vitamin B_{12} each day. There are cases to suggest that vegetarians and vegans who are not taking vitamin B_{12} supplements or food fortified with B_{12} do not consume sufficient servings of B_{12} and have abnormally low blood concentrations of vitamin B_{12}. This is because, unless fortified, plant foods do not contain reliable amounts of active vitamin B_{12}.

It is essential, therefore, that vegetarians consume adequate amounts of dietary supplements or foods that have been fortified with B_{12}, such as vegetable stock, veggie burger mixes, textured vegetable protein, soy milks, vegetable and sunflower margarines, and breakfast cereals. B_{12} used in these foods or supplements is typically grown from vegan sources (such as bacteria). Soybeans and barley seeds from plants grown in soils amended either with cow dung (which is rich in B_{12}) or with pure B_{12} had a higher B_{12} content than those grown without this supplementation.

=== Omega-3 fatty acids ===
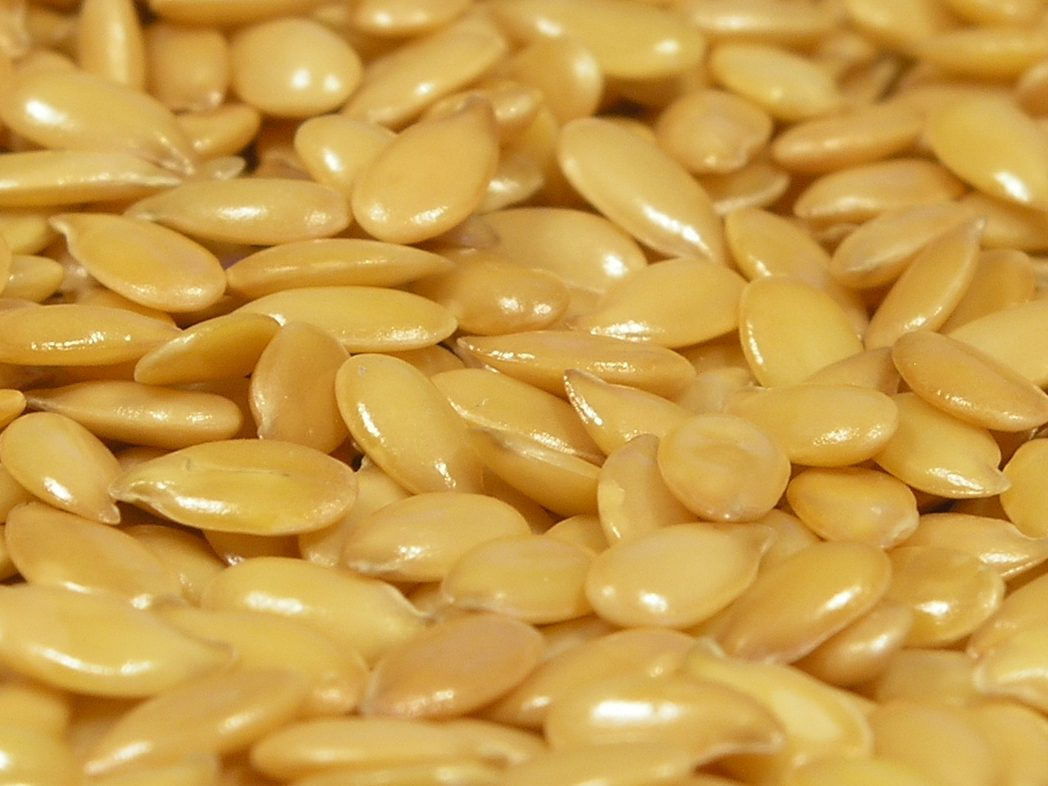
Flaxseeds are a rich source of ALA, but contains negligible amounts of DHA and EPA, the long-chain omega-3 fatty acids the FDA considers to be healthful.

Vegetarian diets can be low in omega-3 fatty acids (O3FAs). Major vegetarian O3FA sources include algae, hempseeds and hempseed oil, walnuts, flaxseeds and flaxseed oil, olive oil, canola oil, avocado, and chia seeds.

A potential problem is that vegetarian diets lacking eggs or generous amounts of edible seaweed generally lack a direct source of long-chain O3FAs such as docosahexaenoic acid (DHA) and eicosapentaenoic acid (EPA). Vegetarian diets may also have a high ratio of omega-6 fatty acids to O3FAs, which inhibits the conversion of short-chain fatty acids such as alpha-Linolenic acid (ALA), which is found in most vegetarian O3FA sources, to EPA and DHA. Short-term supplemental ALA has been shown to increase EPA levels but not DHA levels, suggesting poor conversion of the intermediary EPA to DHA. To remedy this, DHA and EPA supplements derived from microalgae are available.

A 2022 review found that microalgal oil supplementation is consistent in increasing DHA and EPA levels, whilst high dose flaxseed or echium seed oil supplements provide no increase despite significant increases in ALA levels.

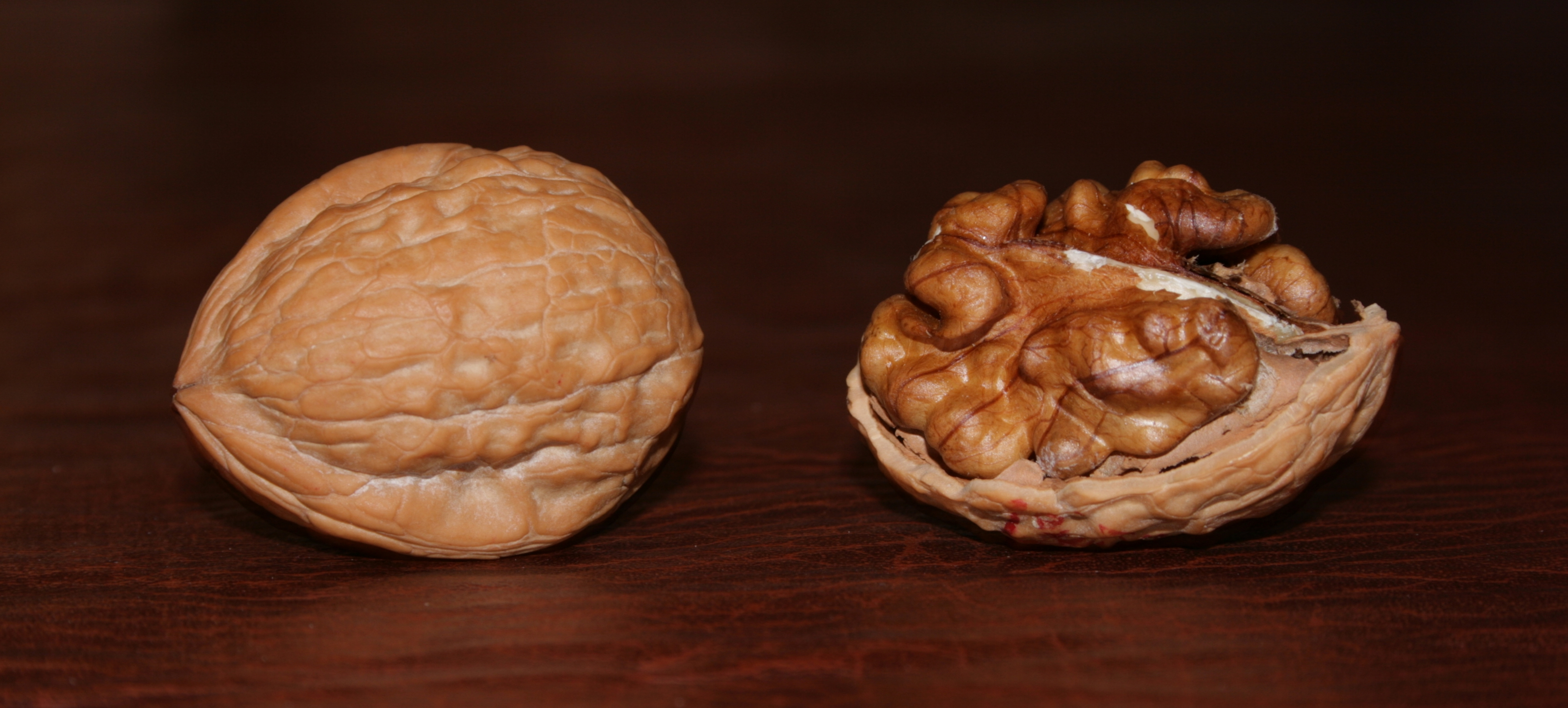
Walnuts are a source of omega-3 fatty acids.

=== Calcium ===
In general, lacto-ovo-vegetarians have a relatively high intake of calcium that meet or exceed calcium recommendations.

A 2022 review found no significant difference in calcium intake between vegetarians and omnivores. Vegetarians can obtain calcium from dairy products, calcium-fortified plant milks, almonds, figs, oranges, calcium-set tofu as well as low-oxalate vegetables such as bok choy, kale and turnip greens.

Compared with omnivores, vegetarians tend to have a lower bone mineral density (BMD) but not a higher fracture rate.

=== Iron ===
Vegetarians are more likely to have lower iron stores compared with non-vegetarians and have a higher risk of iron deficiency anemia. Lacto-ovo-vegetarians that overly rely on dairy consumption may lead to an elevated calcium intake which can affect iron absorption.

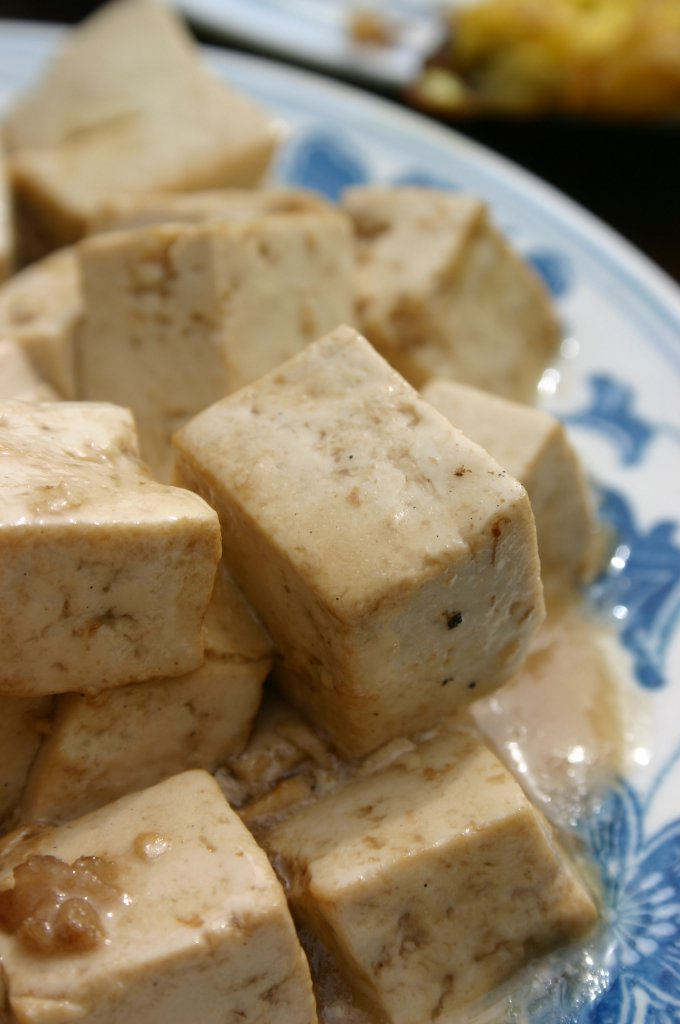
Tofu, a soy product, can be a valuable source of not only iron, but also protein, zinc and calcium for vegetarians.

The recommended iron intake for vegetarians is 180% that of nonvegetarians due to the bioavailability of non-heme iron. Although a lower percentage of non-heme iron is absorbed by the body, greater total amounts of non-heme iron are concentrated in many non-meat sources of iron, and therefore breakfast cereals, eggs, nuts, seeds, and legumes (including soy foods, peas, beans, chickpeas, and lentils) are significant sources of iron, and a well-planned vegetarian diet should not lead to iron deficiency.

Non-heme iron is more sensitive to both inhibitors and enhancers of iron absorption: Vitamin C is an iron absorption enhancer; the main inhibitors for most people are phytates (e.g. legumes and cereal grains), but other inhibitors include tannins (from tea and wine), calcium, and polyphenols.

Iron is an integral part in the chemical structure of many proteins and enzymes, which maintain good health. In humans, iron is an essential component of proteins involved in the transport of oxygen of red blood cells. Iron also helps regulate cell growth and cellular differentiation.

=== Zinc ===
A 2013 review found that zinc intake and serum zinc concentrations were significantly lower in populations that follow vegetarian diets compared with non-vegetarians.

Phytates in many whole grains, and dietary fiber in many plant foods may interfere with zinc absorption, and marginal zinc intake has poorly understood effects. Vegetarians may need more than the US Recommended Daily Allowance of 15 mg of zinc each day to compensate if their diet is high in phytates. Major plant sources of zinc include cooked dried beans, edible seaweed, fortified breakfast cereals, soy products, nuts, peas, and seeds.

=== Iodine ===
One study reported a "potential danger of [iodine] (I) deficiency disorders due to strict forms of vegetarian nutrition, especially when fruits and vegetables grown in soils with low [iodine] levels are ingested." Iodine, however, is usually supplied by iodized salt and other sources in first world countries. Other significant vegetarian sources of iodine include edible seaweed and bread made with dough conditioners.

== Health effects ==
Evidence suggests that vegetarian diets have beneficial effects on blood lipids and that vegetarians have a reduced risk of cancer, cardiovascular disease, hypertension and type 2 diabetes. Typical vegetarian diets are high in fiber, which is protective against colon cancer.

=== Vegetarian diets in children ===
If done properly, children can thrive from a vegetarian diet.Like adults, children need plenty of key nutrients and should have diets low in fat, salt, and sugar. A 2009 study done by TarGET Kids shows that vegetarian and vegan children were twice as likely to be underweight compared to meat eating children. The majority of underweight children, both vegetarian and non-vegetarian, were of Eastern Asian descent. The correlation between race and being underweight in the study is unknown, but a clinical assistant professor in the pediatrics department at Stanford School of Medicine said that race could potentially play a factor in the malnourishment displayed.

== See also ==
- Vegetarian cuisine
- Vegan nutrition
- The China–Cornell–Oxford Project in the 1980s
- The China Study done 2005
