= Lloyd Christ Wicke =

American Methodist bishop (1901–1996)

Lloyd Christ Wicke (1901–1996) was an American bishop of The Methodist Church and the United Methodist Church, elected in 1948. When he died in 1996 he was the oldest of the 117 active and retired United Methodist Bishops at that time, as well as the last one elected during the decade of the 1940s.

== Birth and family ==
Lloyd was born 22 May 1901 in Cleveland, Ohio, the son of John and Katherine Christ Wicke. Lloyd married Gertrude Jane Allen of Waterville, New York in 1924. Mrs. Wicke died 2 January 1978 in Fort Myers, Florida after a long illness. The Wickes had taken up residence in Fort Myers following the Bishop's retirement in 1972. In addition to her husband, Mrs. Wicke was survived by their two daughters (of Basking Ridge, New Jersey and Fort Wayne, Indiana, respectively), and by a sister, Mrs. Charles McClean of Waterville. Mrs. Wicke was interred in the Waterville Cemetery.

In 1979 Bishop Wicke married Eunice LeBourveau Ensley, the widow of fellow U.M. Bishop F. Gerald Ensley. She graduated from Boston University in 1932 and taught school before marrying Francis Gerald Ensley. He died in 1976. She was President of the Methodist Council of Bishops' Wives at one time, as well as active in the Alpha Phi and P.E.O. sororities. She was a member of the North Broadway U.M. Church in Columbus, Ohio when she died 11 July 2002. She was survived by four children and their spouses: Frederick and Jean Ensley, Philip and Cynthia Ensley, Elizabeth and Roger Grime, and Charlotte and Robert Linville; by a stepdaughter, Elaine Wicke Cowen; and by eleven grandchildren and three great-grandchildren. A memorial service celebrating her life was held 18 July 2002 at the Westminster Thurber Retirement Community in Columbus.

== Education ==
Lloyd earned the B.A. degree in 1923 from Baldwin Wallace College, Berea, Ohio. He then earned his B.D. and Ph.D. degrees from The Theological School at Drew University, Madison, New Jersey.

== Ordained ministry ==
Following college graduation, the Rev. Wicke served two years in the Central German Annual Conference of the Methodist Episcopal Church as a pastor in Terre Haute, Indiana and in Chili, Ohio. During his final year of seminary, Rev. Wicke served the East Side Terrace Church in Paterson, New Jersey. Following seminary graduation, he was ordained an elder in the Newark Annual Conference by Adna Wright Leonard. Between 1926 and 1943 he served churches in Lafayette, Alpine, and Leonia, New Jersey. He was appointed superintendent of the Jersey City District, 1941–43. Then he was appointed to the Mt. Lebanon Methodist Church in the Mt. Lebanon suburb of Pittsburgh.

== Episcopal ministry ==
The Rev. Dr. Lloyd Christ Wicke was elected to the episcopacy of The Methodist Church by the 1948 Northeastern Jurisdictional Conference. He was assigned to the Pittsburgh episcopal area, where he served until 1960. During the time of his episcopacy, the Pittsburgh Area included the western third of Pennsylvania and most of the State of West Virginia. In 1960, Bishop Wicke was assigned to the New York Area, serving until his retirement in 1972. During the time of his episcopacy, the New York Episcopal Area included the Troy Annual Conference in northeastern New York, and the entire State of Vermont.

Bishop Wicke served as president of the General Boards of Church and Society and of Global Ministries of the U.M. Church at different times during his episcopacy. He was the president of the Methodist Council of Bishops, 1964–65.

== Church merger ==
One of the highlights of Bishop Wicke's career was chairing the committee of The Methodist Church that drew up the proposal leading to the 1968 denominational merger with the Evangelical United Brethren Church (E.U.B.). During the uniting service in Dallas, Wicke symbolically clasped hands with E.U.B. Bishop, Reuben H. Mueller, across a table bearing the Plan of Union. As they did, they prayerfully said together:

Lord of the Church, we are united in Thee, in Thy Church and in the United Methodist Church.

This prayer was then repeated, in turn, by two children of each denomination, two adolescents, two adults, six clergy representing the two Churches around the world, and finally by the 1,200 delegates to the Uniting Conference from fifty Nations, who stood and joined hands as they voiced this same declaration.

== Death ==
Bishop Lloyd Christ Wicke died 29 December 1996 in Columbus, Ohio at the age of ninety-five. He was survived by his wife, Eunice Ensley Wicke; by his two daughters, Shirley Jane Shoaf and Elaine Nalda Cowen; and by seven grandchildren, twelve great-grandchildren, four stepchildren and eleven step-grandchildren.

== See also ==
- List of bishops of the United Methodist Church
