= Forks Over Knives =

- Theatrical release poster
- Directed by: Lee Fulkerson
- Written by: Lee Fulkerson
- Produced by: John Corry; Brian Wendel
- Starring: T. Colin Campbell, Ph.D; Caldwell Esselstyn, M.D. John A. McDougall, M.D. Neal D. Barnard, M.D. Rip Esselstyn
- Edited by: John Orfanopoulos; Brian Crance; Michael Fahey
- Music by: Ramón Balcázar
- Production company: Monica Beach Media
- Distributed by: Virgil Films and Entertainment
- Release dates: May 6, 2011 (limited release); August 30, 2011 (DVD)
- Running time: 96 minutes
- Country: United States
- Language: English

Forks Over Knives refers to both a 2011 American documentary film and brand that includes books, a magazine, and a website. The original film argues for the health benefits of a whole-food, plant-based diet. In other words, a dietary pattern that avoids all animal products and ultra-processed foods. It emphasizes whole grains, legumes, tubers, vegetables, and fruits, arguing that the diet promoted in the film may serve as a form of chronic illness intervention.

== Film summary ==
Through an examination of the careers of American physician Caldwell Esselstyn and professor of nutritional biochemistry T. Colin Campbell, Forks Over Knives claims that many diseases, including obesity, cardiovascular diseases, and cancer, can be prevented and treated by eating a whole-food, plant-based diet, avoiding processed food and food from animals.

The film includes an overview of the 20-year China–Cornell–Oxford Project that led to Professor Campbell's findings, outlined in his book The China Study (2005), in which he suggests that coronary artery disease, diabetes, obesity, and cancer can be linked to the Western diet of processed and animal-based foods (including dairy products).

The premise of the film was to create the "reverse" of the 2004 documentary Super Size Me, where the film's director "goes on this diet and gets better, instead of getting fatter and sicker."

== Reception ==
The film premiere took place on May 2, 2011 at the SilverScreen Theater at the Pacific Design Center in West Hollywood. Actor Angela Bassett attended the premiere.

On the review aggregator website Rotten Tomatoes, 61% of 36 critics' reviews are positive, with an average rating of 6.3/10. On Metacritic, the film had an average score of 57 out of 100, based on 18 reviews, indicating "mixed or average" reviews.

Roger Ebert of the Chicago Sun-Times gave the film three out of four stars and wrote: "here is a film that could save your life." He wrote "I am unable to eat or drink anything, and my (therefore) perfect diet of canned nutrition has given me an ideal weight and incredibly good blood numbers. I don’t recommend that you get sick to get well, however." In a P.S., he noted "I have recently decided to ditch my canned nutrition and switch to a liquid diet based on fresh fruits and vegetables. Yes, I consulted my physician." Loren King of The Boston Globe gave it three out of four stars and remarked that "what An Inconvenient Truth did for global warming, Lee Fulkerson's persuasive documentary does for a vegan diet". Carrie Rickey of The Philadelphia Inquirer gave the film three out of four stars and described it as "an earnest and fact-filled work of food evangelism." Jeannette Catsoulis of the New York Times described it as making "a pedantic yet persuasive case for banishing meat and dairy from the dinner table," while also being a "trudge through statistics, graphs and grainy film of cholesterol bubbles and arterial plaque."

Sean O'Connell of The Washington Post gave the film two out of four stars and argued that it is "an interesting and informative health lecture that's sandwiched into a dry, repetitive documentary" and said that "it's desperately in need of charisma, humor or personality to balance the steady stream of scientific facts we're asked to absorb". Rex Reed of The New York Observer gave the film 2/4, criticizing its "funereal" tone and writing, "the movie says nothing we don't already know, and 96 minutes is too long to tell us how sick we are." Corey Hall of the Metro Times gave the film a "C" and stated that "while it's impossible to dispute the basic premise that eating more vegetables is good for you, Forks adopts a staunch anti-meat and -dairy stance that leaves the door open for criticism."

Producer Brian Wendel told journalist Avery Yale Kamila of the Portland Press Herald that "it's been very hard to get publicity. It's happened several times at very large publications who said, 'We're sorry, we can't (run a story about the film) because of our advertisers.'" Kamila reported that "Despite the trouble the filmmakers encountered with some mainstream media outlets, the film has generated significant buzz in the social media sphere."

The film was awarded the Documentary/Special Interest Title of the Year in 2012 by the Entertainment Merchants Association.

VegNews listed it as one of "The 18 Best Vegan Documentaries to Start Streaming Now" in 2024.

== Books ==
- Alona Pulde M.D., Matthew Lederman M.D. The Forks Over Knives Plan: How to Transition to the Life-Saving, Whole-Food, Plant-Based Diet, 2014.
- Sroufe, Del. Forks Over Knives—The Cookbook, 2012.
- Stone, Gene. Forks Over Knives: The Plant Based Way to Health, 2011.

== See also ==
- List of vegan and plant-based media
- Whole-food, plant-based diet
