= Vegan nutrition =

Nutritional and human health aspects of vegan diets

A vegan meal composition shown using the food plate method

Vegan nutrition refers to the nutritional and human health aspects of vegan diets. The Academy of Nutrition and Dietetics has stated that a vegan diet is suitable to meet all recommendations for nutrients in every stage of human life. Vegan diets tend to be higher in dietary fiber, magnesium, folic acid, iron (concretely non-heme iron), vitamin C, vitamin E, and phytochemicals; and lower in calories, saturated fat, cholesterol, long-chain omega-3 fatty acids, vitamin D, calcium, zinc, vitamin B_{12} and choline.

Researchers agree that those on a vegan diet should take a vitamin B_{12} dietary supplement.

== Reception ==
=== Positions of dietetic and government associations ===
The American Academy of Nutrition and Dietetics and Dietitians of Canada state that properly planned vegan diets are appropriate for all life stages, including pregnancy, lactation, infancy, childhood, and adolescence. The Australian National Health and Medical Research Council similarly recognizes a well-planned vegan diet as viable for any age, as does the Victoria Department of Health, British Dietetic Association, British National Health Service, British Nutrition Foundation, Mayo Clinic, Finnish Food Safety Authority, Heart and Stroke Foundation of Canada, Italian Society of Human Nutrition, Norwegian Directorate for Health, and the Portuguese Directorate-General of Health.

The British National Health Service's Eatwell Plate allows for an entirely plant-based diet, as does the United States Department of Agriculture's (USDA) MyPlate. The USDA allows tofu to replace meat in the National School Lunch Program. The American Academy of Nutrition and Dietetics adds that well-planned vegan diets are also appropriate for older adults and athletes.

In 2016, the German Society for Nutrition cautioned against a vegan diet for babies, children, and adolescents, and during pregnancy and breastfeeding, due to insufficient data. In 2020, the German Society for Nutrition issued an update stating that they do not recommend a vegan diet for babies, children and adolescents, or for pregnancy or breastfeeding, citing insufficient data for these subpopulations.

The Danish Health Authority have advised vegan parents to seek professional dietary advice, noting that "young children who are fed a vegan diet can grow and develop normally if they receive the right supplements to the diet, and the energy content is sufficient. It requires detailed knowledge of diet and nutritional needs. The parents must therefore be encouraged to seek advice from a licensed clinical dietitian to ensure that the child's diet is sufficient." The National Institute for Health and Welfare in Finland have stated that a well-balanced vegan diet is safe during pregnancy but mothers require the guidance of a nutritional therapist.

The State of Israel Ministry of Health advises vegan mothers to consult with a dietitian. The Swiss Federal Commission for Nutrition do not recommend vegan diets for pregnant women, infants and children or older adults due to lack of data and risk of certain nutrient deficiencies. The Royal Academy of Medicine of Belgium do not recommend a vegan diet during pregnancy, breastfeeding and infancy.

The German Society for Allergology and Clinical Immunology (DGAKI) position paper on vegan diets in 2023 noted that "to ensure an adequate supply of vitamin B_{12}, but also of calcium, iron, iodine, zinc, as well as high-quality protein and long-chain omega-3 fatty acids (EPA/DHA), an in-depth study of the subject of nutrition, time investment, and supplementation, with regard to various nutrients, is required."

The American Heart Association (AHA) gave the vegan diet a 78% score of its alignment with the 2021 AHA Dietary Guidance. They noted that benefits of a vegan diet are its emphasis on fruits, legumes, nuts, vegetables and whole grains which are heart healthy but a key challenge is its restrictive nature and risk of Vitamin B_{12} deficiency.

=== Position of paediatric associations ===
The position of the Canadian Paediatric Society is that "well-planned vegetarian and vegan diets with appropriate attention to specific nutrient components can provide a healthy alternative lifestyle at all stages of fetal, infant, child and adolescent growth." It is recommended that attention should be given to nutrient intake, particularly protein, vitamins B_{12} and D, essential fatty acids (particularly ALA with a focus on sufficient levels of DHA and EPA), iron, zinc, and calcium.

Although position papers from America and Canada have stated that well-planned vegan diets, are suitable for every stage of life, European statements have been more cautious of vegan diets in pregnancy and infancy. The British Paediatric Association (BPA), European Paediatric Association (EPA), European Society for Paediatric Gastroenterology, Hepatology, and Nutrition (ESPGHAN), Croatian Society for Pediatric Gastroenterology, Hepatology and Nutrition (HDPGHP) and the Italian Society of Paediatrics (SIP) have included strong recommendations to parents that vegan diets should not be adopted by pregnant women and infants without medical or dietetic supervision.

The German Society for Paediatric and Adolescent Medicine, Polish National Consultant in the Field of Paediatrics and Spanish Paediatric Association do not recommend vegan diets during infancy or childhood and instead advise a balanced omnivorous or lacto-ovo-vegetarian diet to meet nutritional requirements.

The French Pediatric Hepatology, Gastroenterology and Nutrition Group have stated that a vegan diet is "not recommended for infants, children, and adolescents due to the risk of multiple nutritional deficiencies that are inevitable in the absence of supplements". In 2017, the Italian Society of Preventive and Social Pediatrics (SIPPS), together with the Italian Federation of Pediatricians (FIMP) and the Italian Society of Perinatal Medicine (SIMP) issued a joint position paper which concluded that vegan diets cannot be recommended for children because the diet leads to deficiencies in vitamin B_{12}, calcium, DHA, iron and vitamin D. When these nutrients are missing, it negatively affects children's growth and neurocognitive development.

The Slovenian Paediatric Society have advised against vegan diets for pregnant and lactating women, newborns, infants, children, and adolescents.

In 2025 the European Society for Paediatric Gastroenterology Hepatology and Nutrition published a position paper which concluded that "Current evidence is inconclusive to determine whether a strictly vegan diet supports normal childhood growth, although no significant differences in height or body mass index z-scores were observed compared to omnivorous peers".

== Pregnancy, infants and children ==
According to a 2015 systematic review, there was little evidence available about vegetarian and vegan diets during pregnancy, and a lack of randomized studies meant that the effects of diet could not be distinguished from confounding factors. It concluded: "Within these limits, vegan-vegetarian diets may be considered safe in pregnancy, provided that attention is paid to vitamin and trace element requirements." A daily source of vitamin B_{12} is important for pregnant and lactating vegans, as is vitamin D if there are concerns about low sun exposure. A different review found that pregnant vegetarians consumed less zinc than pregnant non-vegetarians, with both groups' intake below recommended levels; however, the review found no significant difference between groups in actual zinc levels in bodily tissues, nor any effect on gestation period or birth weight.

Researchers have reported cases of vitamin B_{12} deficiency in lactating vegetarian mothers that were linked to deficiencies and neurological disorders in their children. The UK National Health Service recommends that a physician or registered dietitian should be consulted about taking supplements during pregnancy.

A 2022 French expert consensus paper recommended a minimum of 800 IU and a maximum of 1600 IU of vitamin D per day for vegan children aged 2-18 years.

=== Public reaction ===
Because of the sensitive nature of pregnancy, vegan diets have attracted significant attention from the media, both positive and negative. Much of the reaction has focused on nutrition.

Negative attention stems from cases of nutritional deficiencies that have come to the attention of the courts, including the death of a baby in New Zealand in 2002 due to hypocobalaminemia, i.e. vitamin B_{12} deficiency, from a poorly planned diet. Positive attention includes in 2018 when journalist Rebecca Seal of The Guardian reported on the growing number of vegan children in the United Kingdom and cited guidance issued by the British Dietetic Association in 2017 that well-planned vegan diets are safe for all ages. In 2017, BBC Good Food published a guide to vegan feeding for children and infants. In 2016, journalist Avery Yale Kamila of the Portland Press Herald wrote about raising a giant baby on a vegan diet who was wearing 24 months clothing at six months.

== Critical nutrients ==
The American Academy of Nutrition and Dietetics states that special attention may be necessary to ensure that a vegan diet will provide adequate amounts of vitamin B_{12}, omega-3 fatty acids, vitamin D, calcium, iodine, iron, and zinc. These nutrients are available in plant foods, with the exception of vitamin B_{12}, which can be obtained only from B_{12}-fortified vegan foods or supplements. Iodine may also require supplementation, such as using iodized salt.

=== Vitamin B_{12} ===
Vegan food pyramid based on suggestions from the American Dietetic Association

Vitamin B_{12} is not made by plants or animals, but by bacteria that grow in soil, feces, dirty water, the intestines of animals or laboratories, so plant foods are not reliable sources of B_{12}. It is synthesized by some gut bacteria in humans and other animals, but humans cannot absorb the B_{12} made in their guts, as it is made in the colon which is too far from the small intestine, where absorption of B_{12} occurs. Ruminants, such as cows and sheep, absorb B_{12} produced by bacteria in their guts. Nonetheless, many farm animals are also supplemented with B_{12}, with some sources citing that as much as 90% of the world's B_{12} supplements are fed to livestock.

Animals store vitamin B_{12} in liver and muscle and some pass the vitamin into their eggs and milk; meat, liver, eggs and milk are therefore sources of B_{12}.

The Vegan Society, the Vegetarian Resource Group, and the Physicians Committee for Responsible Medicine, among others, recommend that every vegan consume adequate B_{12} either from fortified foods or by taking a supplement.

Vitamin B_{12} deficiency is potentially extremely serious, leading to megaloblastic anemia (an undersupply of oxygen due to malformed red blood cells), nerve degeneration and irreversible neurological damage. Cases of severe vitamin B_{12} deficiency have been reported in vegan adults, children infants and toddlers.

Because B_{12} is stored in large amounts in the liver, deficiency in adults may begin only years after adoption of a diet lacking B_{12}. For infants and young children who have not built up these stores, onset of B_{12} deficiency can be faster and supplementation for vegan children is thus crucial.

Evidence shows that vegans who are not taking vitamin B_{12} supplements do not consume sufficient B_{12} and often have abnormally low blood concentrations of vitamin B_{12}. This is because, unless fortified, plant foods do not contain reliable amounts of active vitamin B_{12}. Vegans are advised to adopt one of the following dietary options:

- consume fortified foods 2-3 times per day to get at least 3 micrograms of vitamin B_{12},
- or take at least 10 micrograms of B_{12} as a supplement once per day,
- or take at least 2000 micrograms of B_{12} as a supplement once per week.

B_{12} is more efficiently absorbed in small regular doses, which explains why the quantity required rises so quickly as frequency goes down.

The US National Institutes of Health recommends B_{12} intake in a range from 0.4 micrograms a day for infants, to 2.4 micrograms for adults, and up to 2.8 micrograms for nursing mothers. The European Food Safety Authority set the Adequate Intake at 1.5 micrograms for infants, 4 micrograms for children and adults, and 4.5 and 5 micrograms during pregnancy and nursing. These amounts can be obtained by eating B_{12} fortified foods, which include some common breakfast cereals, some fortified plant milks, and meat analogues, as well as from common multivitamins. Some of the fortified foods require only a single serving to provide the recommended B_{12} amounts. Because fortification varies among products, plant milks should not be assumed to contain vitamin B12 unless it is listed on the nutrition label.

It has been suggested that nori (an edible seaweed), tempeh (a fermented soybean food), and nutritional yeast may be sources of vitamin B_{12}. In 2016, the Academy of Nutrition and Dietetics stated that nori, fermented foods (such as tempeh), spirulina, chlorella algae, and unfortified nutritional yeast are not adequate sources of vitamin B_{12} and that vegans need to consume regularly fortified foods or supplements containing B_{12}. Otherwise, vitamin B_{12} deficiency may develop, as has been demonstrated in case studies of vegan infants, children, and adults.

Vitamin B_{12} is mostly manufactured by industrial fermentation of various kinds of bacteria, which make forms of cyanocobalamin, which are further processed to generate the ingredient included in supplements and fortified foods. A Pseudomonas denitrificans strain was most commonly used as of 2017. It is grown in a medium containing sucrose, yeast extract, and several metallic salts. To increase vitamin production, it is supplemented with sugar beet molasses, or, less frequently, with choline. Certain brands of B_{12} supplements are certified vegan.

=== Iodine ===
Humans require iodine for the production of thyroid hormones that enable normal thyroid function. Iodine supplementation may be necessary for vegans in countries where salt is not typically iodized, where it is iodized at low levels, or where, as in Britain and Ireland, dairy products are relied upon for iodine delivery because of low levels in the soil. Iodine can be obtained from most vegan multivitamins or regular consumption of seaweeds, such as kelp.

Some commercial plant milks are fortified with iodine and can contribute to iodine intake, although fortification varies considerably by product and country. In a 2024 survey of non-organic plant-based milk alternatives sold in the United Kingdom, 48% were iodine-fortified, with oat- and soy-based drinks among the most frequently fortified. Unfortified plant milks generally contain substantially less iodine than cow’s milk.

Vegan diets typically require special attention for iodine, for which the only substantial and reliable vegan sources are sea vegetables, iodized salt and supplements. The iodine content of sea vegetables varies widely and may provide more than the recommended upper limit of iodine intake.

A 2023 review found that vegans have lower iodine compared with people consuming omnivorous diets.

=== Protein ===
Proteins are composed of amino acids. Vegans obtain all their protein from plants, meat eaters usually a third, and ovo-lacto vegetarians half. Sources of plant protein include legumes such as soy beans (consumed as tofu, tempeh, textured vegetable protein, soy milk, and edamame), peas, peanuts, black beans, and chickpeas (the latter often eaten as hummus); grains such as quinoa, brown rice, corn, barley, bulgur, and wheat (the latter eaten as bread and seitan); and nuts and seeds. Protein content varies considerably among plant milks; soy-based beverages generally contain more protein than oat- or almond-based beverages. Combinations that contain high amounts of all the essential amino acids include rice and beans, corn and beans, and hummus and whole-wheat pita. In 2012, the United States Department of Agriculture stated that soy protein (tofu) may replace meat protein in the National School Lunch Program.

The Academy of Nutrition and Dietetics said in 2009 that a variety of plant foods consumed over the course of a day can provide all the essential amino acids for healthy adults, which means that protein combining in the same meal is generally not necessary. The Dietitian's Guide to Vegetarian Diets writes that there is little reason to advise vegans to increase their protein intake; but erring on the side of caution, the authors recommend a 25 percent increase over the RDA for adults, to 1 g/kg (.45 g/lb) of body weight.

=== Omega-3 fatty acids ===
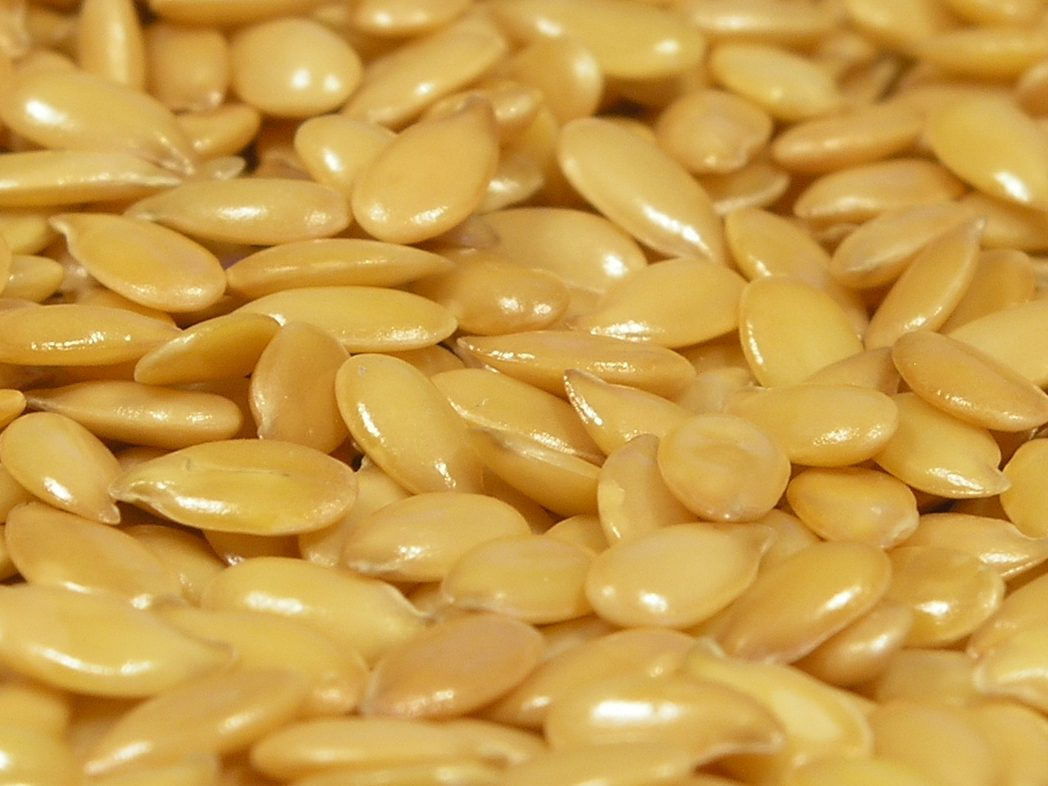
Flaxseeds are a rich source of ALA, the precursor to DHA and EPA, the omega-3 fatty acids.

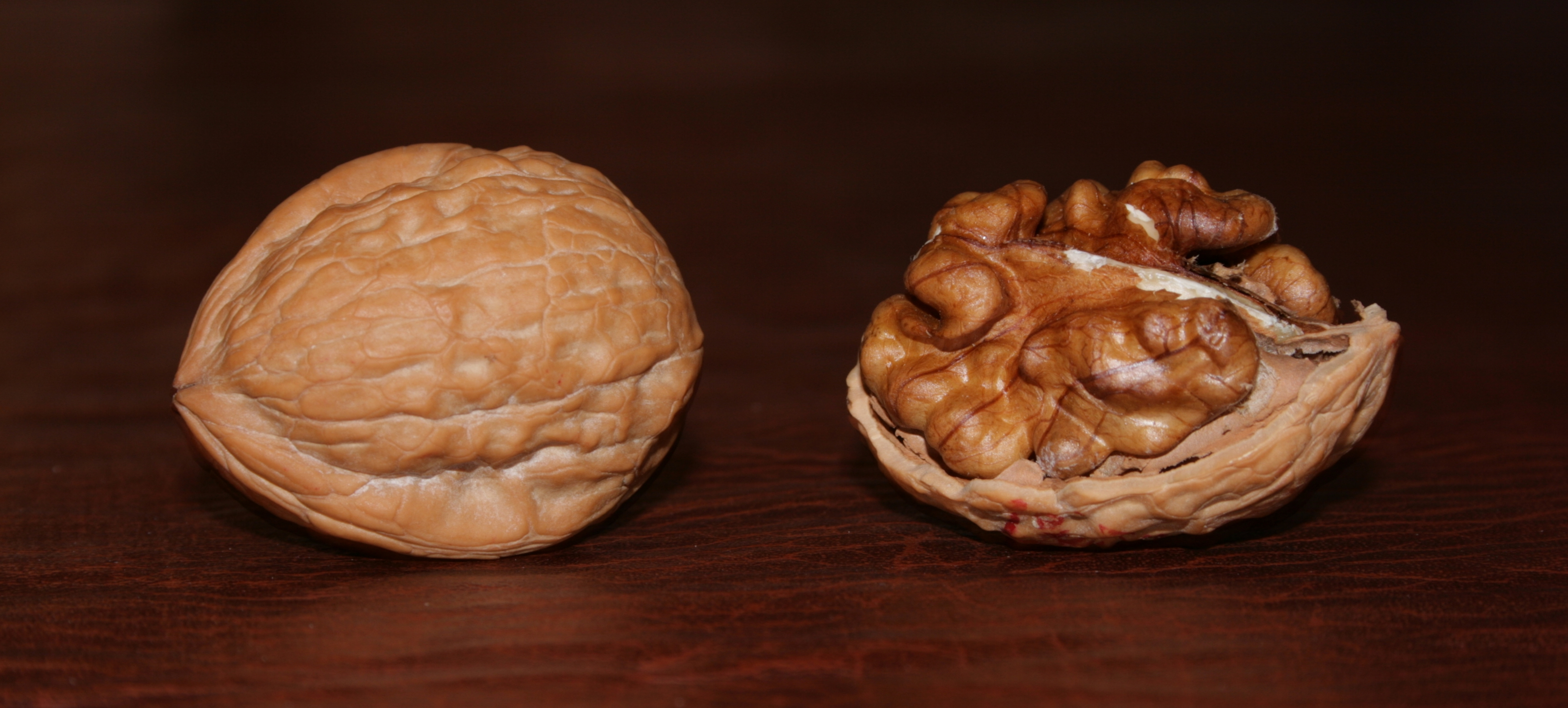
Walnuts are another rich source of ALA, the precursor to DHA and EPA, the omega-3 oils.

Experts have not established recommended amounts for omega-3 fatty acids, except for ALA (α-Linolenic acid). The human body can use ALA to synthesize DHA (docosahexaenoic acid) and EPA (eicosapentaenoic acid). However, this only works efficiently if the ratio between omega 3 (mainly in flaxseed, chia seeds) to omega 6 (mainly in sunflower oil) does not exceed 1:5.

Major vegan sources of the essential omega-3 fatty acid ALA include walnuts, chia seeds, flaxseeds and flaxseed oil, canola (rapeseed) oil, algae oil, hempseeds and hempseed oil, olive oil, and avocado.

While there is little evidence of adverse health or cognitive effects due to DHA deficiency in adult vegetarians or vegans, fetal and breast milk levels remain a concern. A 2025 review found that vegan diets had significantly reduced concentrations of DHA and EPA.

DHA supplements derived from DHA-rich microalgae are available, and the human body can also convert DHA to EPA.

=== Calcium ===
The Academy of Nutrition and Dietetics recommends that vegans consume two to three daily servings of calcium-rich foods with good bioavailability, which may include calcium-fortified soy milk and other fortified plant-milk alternatives, calcium-set tofu and certain leafy vegetables.

In a 2023 review, vegan diets were shown to have a lower calcium intake than omnivorous or vegetarian diets.

Consuming a vegan diet is associated with lower bone mineral density (BMD). It is unclear if the magnitude is clinically relevant, but it seems that vegans tend to have higher fracture rates.

However, diet quality is not always considered in studies. High-quality vegan or vegetarian diets may therefore afford the same bone health as omnivorous diets. When sufficient vitamin D and calcium are consumed, there seems to be no difference in bone health.

=== Iron ===
Due to the low absorption rate on non-heme iron, it is recommended for vegans to eat dark leafy greens and other iron-rich foods in combination with vitamin C daily, as vitamin C has been shown to improve iron absorption.

Iron levels in vegans may be lower due to the limited bioavailability of plant-based dietary iron, which is believed by some researchers to be 5–15 percent compared to 18 percent from animal-based heme iron. Iron-deficiency anemia is found as often in non-vegetarians as in vegetarians. Lower iron stores may increase the risk for iron deficiency. However, as high iron stores are associated with health risks, lower iron stores may be beneficial.

High-iron vegan foods include whole grains, legumes (soybeans, black beans, lentils, chickpeas), nuts, spinach, tempeh, and tofu.

=== Zinc ===
Coupled with lower bioavailability, vegan diets may have lower intake and serum levels of zinc.

Phytates can inhibit the absorption of zinc. Depending on the amount of zinc in a diet (low, moderate, high), the German Nutrition Society (DGE) has established three different reference values for intake of zinc. For diets that include mostly or exclusively plant-based protein sources, the DGE recommends 16mg of zinc per day for men and 10mg of zinc per day for women.

=== Vitamin D ===
The main function of vitamin D in the body is to enhance absorption of calcium for normal mineralization of bones and calcium-dependent tissues.

Sunlight, fortified foods, and dietary supplements are the main sources of vitamin D for vegans. Humans produce vitamin D naturally in response to sun exposure and ultraviolet light (UV) acting on skin to stimulate vitamin D synthesis. UV light penetrates the skin at wavelengths between 290 and 320 nanometers, where it is then converted into vitamin D_{3}. Vitamin D_{2} can be obtained from fungi, such as mushrooms exposed to sun or industrial ultraviolet light, offering a vegan choice for dietary or supplemental vitamin D. Some commercial plant milks, including oat-, soy- and almond-based beverages, are fortified with vitamin D, although fortification levels vary among products and markets.

The recommended daily intake of vitamin D for adults is 600 IU (15 micrograms), and for adults over 70 years old, 800 IU (20 micrograms).

Vitamin D comes in two forms. Cholecalciferol (vitamin D_{3}) is synthesized in the skin after exposure to the sun or consumed from food, usually from animal sources. Ergocalciferol (vitamin D_{2}) is derived from ergosterol from UV-exposed mushrooms or yeast. When produced industrially as supplements, vitamin D_{3} is typically derived from lanolin in sheep wool. However, both provitamins and vitamins D_{2} and D_{3} have been discovered in various species of edible Cladina lichens (especially Cladina rangiferina). These edible lichen are harvested in the wild for producing vegan vitamin D_{3}. Conflicting studies have suggested that the two forms of vitamin D may or may not be bioequivalent. According to 2011 research from the U. S. National Academy of Medicine (then called Institute of Medicine), the differences between vitamins D_{2} and D_{3} do not affect metabolism, both function as prohormones, and when activated, exhibit identical responses in the body. Although vitamin D_{3} is produced in small amounts by lichens or algae exposed to sunlight, industrial production in commercial quantities is limited, and there are few supplement products as of 2019.

=== Choline ===
Some news reports presented vegan diets as deficient in choline following an opinion piece in the BMJ by a nutritionist affiliated with the meat industry. Although many animal products, like liver and egg, contain high amounts of choline (355 mg/3 oz and 126 mg/large egg, respectively), wheat germ (172 mg/cup), Brussels sprouts (63 mg/cup), and broccoli (62 mg/cup) are also good sources of choline.

The National Academy of Medicine in the United States recommends a daily intake of 550 mg for men and 425 mg for women, while the European Food Safety Authority (EFSA) set an adequate intake level of 400 mg per day for adults in 2016.

The German Society for Nutrition does not mention choline as a critical nutrient in its latest 2024 evaluation of vegan nutrition.

== See also ==
- Vegetarian nutrition
- Raw veganism
- The China Study, a book about vegan versus non-vegan nutrition from 2005
- Vegan diets, substitutions, and meat analogues, a section about common vegan foods in the article Veganism
