= Susan Lyne =

American business executive and Entrepreneur (born 1951)

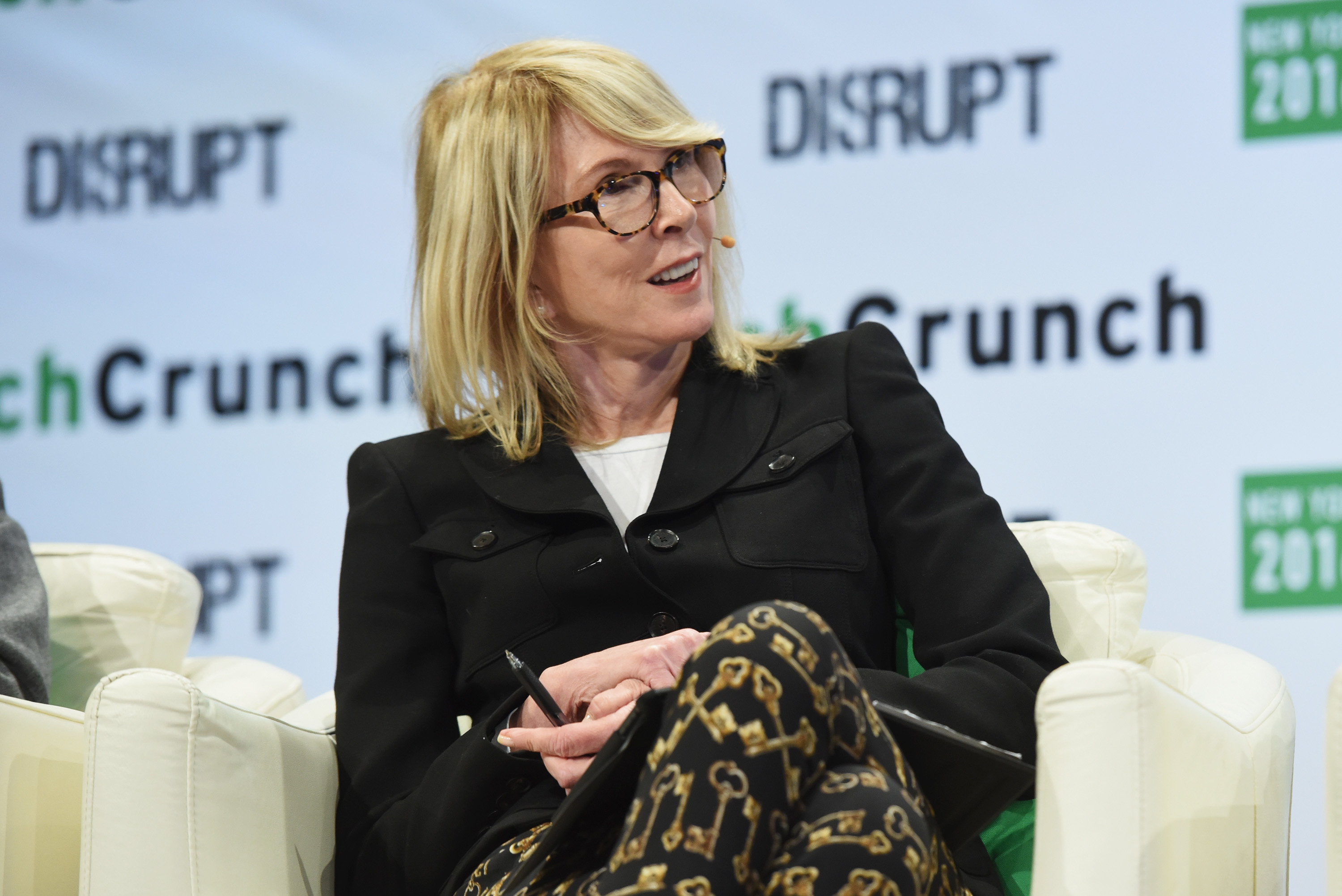
- Susan Lyne in 2016
- Born: Susan M. Lyne; April 30, 1951 (age 75); Boston, Massachusetts, U.S.
- Education: University of California, Berkeley (dropped out)
- Occupations: Businessperson; Media executive; Journalist; Entrepreneur
- Years active: 1970s–present
- Known for: Founder of BBG Ventures; Founding editor of Premiere Magazine (US edition)
- Television: Lost; The Bachelor; Desperate Housewives; Grey's Anatomy; The Apprentice: Martha Stewart
- Title: See list: Executive Vice President of The Walt Disney Company (1996–2002); President of ABC Entertainment (2002–2004); President and CEO of Martha Stewart Living Omnimedia (2004–2008); Chairperson and CEO of Gilt Groupe (2008–2013); Executive Vice President and CEO of the AOL Brand Group (2013–2014); Managing Partner and Founder of BBG Ventures (2014–present)
- Board member of: Gopro; Blade Air Mobility
- Spouse: George Crile (m. 1984; died 2006)
- Children: 2
- Awards: Advertising Age Award; Matrix Award

Susan Lyne (born April 30, 1951) is an American media executive and entrepreneur. She is the co-founder and Managing Partner of BBG Ventures, a venture capital firm that invests in early-stage companies. Over the course of her career, she has held several senior leadership positions in various companies. She has been Chief Executive Officer (CEO) of Martha Stewart Living Omnimedia, the fashion e-commerce platform Gilt Groupe, and the AOL Brand Group. In addition, she was President at ABC Entertainment, where she oversaw the development of prime-time programming. She also was an Executive Vice President at both The Walt Disney Company and AOL.

She has been a director on the boards of public and private companies. She is as an independent director at GoPro, a role she has held since 2017, and is a board member of Blade Air Mobility, a technology-powered air mobility platform. Previously she held director positions with Gilt Groupe, AOL, Martha Stewart Living Omnimedia, Starz, and CIT Group.

== Early life and education ==
Susan Lyne was born on April 30, 1951, and raised near Boston, Massachusetts. She was the eldest of five children, and raised in a conservative Irish Catholic family. Lyne attended an all-girls school for her early education.

She went on to study at the University of California, Berkeley, but left before graduating.

== Career ==
Susan Lyne began her career in publishing with editorial roles at The Village Voice and New Times. In 1987, she founded Premiere, a magazine focused on the movie industry, where she was editor in chief for many years. In January 1996, Lyne joined The Walt Disney Company as Executive Vice President of Acquisitions, Development, and New Business for Walt Disney Pictures and Television, a position in which she established the studio’s East Coast office. Two years later, in March 1998, she transitioned to ABC Entertainment as Executive Vice President of Movies and Miniseries. She was later appointed President of ABC Entertainment in January 2002, where she oversaw the development of popular series like Grey's Anatomy and Desperate Housewives.

In 2004, Lyne became the President and Chief Executive Officer of Martha Stewart Living Omnimedia (MSLO), a role she took on during a period of uncertainty for the company, due to the conviction of its founder Martha Stewart, for an insider trading incident. She focused on stabilizing operations and diversifying its business model. After leaving MSLO in 2008, Lyne took on the role of Chairperson and CEO at Gilt Groupe, an online retailer of fashion and lifestyle products. During her time at Gilt Groupe, the company expanded its membership base and navigated economic challenges.

In 2013, Lyne was appointed CEO of AOL's Brand Group, where she managed various content brands, including TechCrunch and Engadget. The following year, she shifted her focus to venture capital by founding BBG Ventures, which primarily invests in early-stage companies led by women. In 2024, BBG Ventures announced a $60 million fund, expanding its focus to include a broader range of underrepresented entrepreneurs. Lyne has also been on the boards of several companies, including GoPro and Blade Air Mobility.

== Personal life ==
Susan Lyne was married to George Crile, a former producer for 60 Minutes. The couple has two daughters, Susan and Jane. Lyne has also been involved in philanthropic work, particularly in areas related to women’s empowerment and education.

== Board and affiliations ==
Lyne has been on the boards of multiple companies. Her board memberships include:

- GoPro – Board Director since 2017 to present.
- Blade Air Mobility – Joined the board in 2021, Director and Chair of the Compensation to present.
- Gilt Groupe – Board director from 2008-2013
- AOL – Board director from 2009-2013 .
- Martha Stewart Living Omnimedia – Board director from 2004 to 2008, concurrent with her role as President and CEO.
- Starz – Board director from 2013-2016.
- Member of The Council on Foreign Relations.
- Member of Chancellor’s Council, UC Berkeley.

Additionally, she has been a trustee for Rockefeller University and The New School, and previously held trustee positions with The Posse Foundation and The Public Theater.

== Recognition ==
She has been recognized for her contributions to the tech and communications industries over the course of her career. She was named Ad Age's Publishing Executive of the Year and received the Matrix Award from New York Women in Communications. In 2019, she was listed among Crain's Notable Women in Tech and recognized by Fast Company as one of the Most Influential Women in Tech. In 2021, she was included in Forbes inaugural 50 Over 50.
