= Karl Heinrich Ritthausen =

German biochemist (1826–1912)

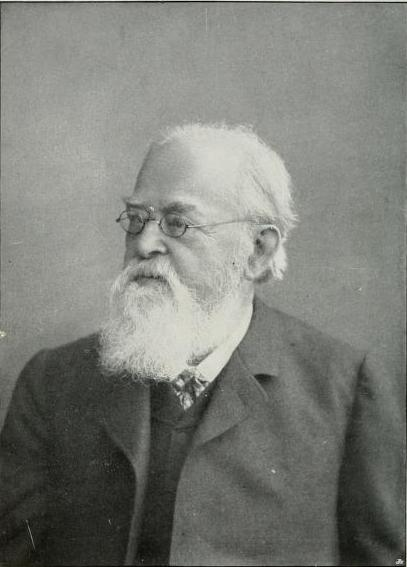
- Ritthausen c. 1913
- Born: 13 January 1826; Armenruh bei Goldberg, Silesia, now Poland
- Died: 16 October 1912 (aged 86); Berlin, Germany
- Education: Liebig's institute at Giessen; Royal Agricultural Academy at Waldau, near Königsberg
- Known for: Glutamic acid Protein combining
- Scientific career
- Fields: Biochemistry; Agricultural chemistry
- Workplaces: University of Königsberg

Karl Heinrich Ritthausen (13 January 1826 – 16 October 1912) was a German biochemist who identified two amino acids and made other contributions to the science of plant proteins.

== Education ==
Ritthausen was born in Armenruh, near Goldburg, Silesia, Prussia, in today's Poland.

Ritthausen's first advanced education in chemistry was in Leipzig and Bonn. He began to do research in Giessen with Justus von Liebig, and was inspired to continue investigation into agricultural chemistry. He returned to Leipzig to study with Otto Linné Erdmann. He was awarded the doctorate degree in 1853. The agricultural experiment stations at Möckern and Ida-Marienhütte were the locations of his first professional appointments. In 1862 he began to publish articles on the proteins of wheat.

== Protein chemistry ==
The site of the experiment station became Poppelsdorf in 1867 when Ritthausen became professor of chemistry at University of Bonn. Working with gliadin, he identified α-aminoglutaric acid or glutamic acid in 1866. Then he identified aspartic acid in an almond extract. These findings extended chemical awareness of functional groups in protein, and appeared in the Journal für Praktische Chemie. Ritthausen published Protein bodies in grains, legumes, and linseed. Contributions to the physiology of seeds for cultivation, nutrition, and fodder in 1872, summarizing the science of proteins in relation to plant physiology and animal nutrition. While in Bonn he got married.

From 1873 to 1899, Ritthausen was professor of chemistry at University of Königsberg. He retired, moved to Berlin in 1903, and died there on 16 October 1912.

== Appreciation ==
In his biography of Ritthausen, Thomas Burr Osborne stated his admiration:

If we are to judge Ritthausen’s work fairly we must remember that it was begun under the influence of Liebig’s erroneous assumption that only a few forms of protein existed; that at that time organic chemistry was in its infancy; that few methods were known that proteins might be isolated from the tissues containing them, or by which different proteins could be separated from one another and be purified; that the only means for preventing the changes caused by bacteria and enzymes were low temperatures; and that the facilities for conducting such investigations were very limited. To the writer, who has had a long experience in the same field, under vastly more favorable conditions prevailing a generation later, it is astounding that Ritthausen accomplished so much, and that the data that he secured were in the main so accurate.

Technical advances by Ritthausen were cited in 1942:

Ritthausen's accomplishments were, first, the discovery of glutamic and aspartic acids as products of the hydrolysis of proteins; second, the realization that hydrolysis is the only method of decomposition of proteins that leads to decomposition products truly characteristic of the original protein molecule; third, the statement that these decomposition products are amino acids, which are formed in proportions characteristic of the particular protein from which they are derived—this statement laid the foundation of our present-day methods of amino acid analysis of proteins; and, fourth, the statement that if proteins differ in amino acid composition, they should also differ in nutritive value to the animal.

A bibliography of Ritthausen’s works was published in 1913 by the Biochemical Bulletin 2:339–46. It was assembled by Lewis W. Fetzer of Georgetown University and the U.S. Department of Agriculture.
