= Protein combining =

Dietary theory for protein nutrition

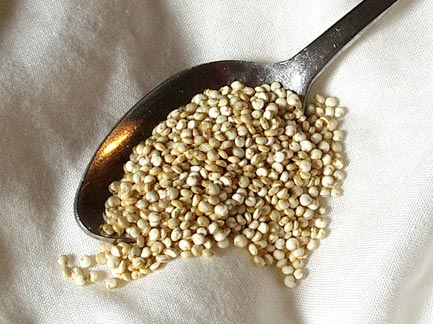
Raw, organic quinoa, one of the few plant products that contains enough of the nine essential amino acids on its own and therefore does not require protein combining.

Protein combining or protein complementing is a process in which individual plant products that by themselves are deficient in one or more essential amino acids are combined with other plant products in order to provide all the essential amino acids for human life. While all individual plant foods provide at least trace amounts of each of the 20 amino acids, they often have an insufficient amount of some of the nine essential amino acids, making protein combining with multiple complementary foods necessary to obtain a diet with "complete protein".

Consuming sufficient amounts of all nine essential amino acids is absolutely essential for human life. As all meats contain all amino acids in sufficient quantities, protein combining is only important for those who eat few to no meats in their regular diet. For those on a vegetarian or vegan diet, therefore, eating a variety of foods that each provide sufficient amounts of some of the essential amino acids is usually the only way to receive a full slate of the nine essential amino acids, since very few plant products provide a sufficient amount of all nine. However, in practice, it is so easy to achieve protein combining that most people do not need to consciously aim to reach a diet with complete protein. For instance, rice and beans, a staple combination throughout the world, combine to provide more than enough of all the essential amino acids just between the two of them.

Protein combining was historically promoted as a method of compensating for protein deficiencies in most vegetables as foods, found in limiting percentages revealed in their respective amino acid profiles. In this dogma of the 1970s, each meal needed to be combined to form complete proteins. Though it is undisputed that diverse foods can be thoughtfully combined to make a more nutritious meal, studies on essential amino acid contents in plant proteins have shown that careful combination in each individual meal is not at all required for vegetarians and vegans to reach the desired level of essential amino acids as long as their diets are varied and daily caloric requirements are met. In other words, combination can happen over a longer course of time.

== Concept ==
Protein nutrition is complex because any proteinogenic amino acid may be the limiting factor in metabolism. Mixing livestock feeds can optimize for growth, or minimize cost while maintaining adequate growth. Similarly, human nutrition is subject to Liebig's law of the minimum: The lowest level of one of the essential amino acids will be the limiting factor in metabolism.

If the content of a single indispensable amino acid in the diet is less than the individual's requirement, then it will limit the utilization of other amino acids and thus prevent the normal rates of synthesis even when the total nitrogen intake level is adequate. Thus the "limiting amino acid" will determine the nutritional value of the total nitrogen or protein in the diet.

Protein sources, including plants, are thus rated by their limiting amino acids.

In any diet, it is critical to consume enough of each essential amino acid. While this is very easy in any diet which consumes meat, a plant-based diet may theoretically miss out on one or more of the essential amino acids, consuming them only in very small quantities. However, in practice, the vast majority of satisfying vegan diets contain more than enough variety in their component foods to meet the minimum requirements of all essential amino acids.

In addition to grains, such as corn, rice, or wheat, vegetable protein also occurs in legumes, which include beans and peanuts. Grains tend to be deficient in tryptophan and lysine, whereas legumes lack methionine Thus a meal combining grains and legumes such as the Mexican peasant dish of corn tortillas and refried beans is basically complete in amino acid content.

— Stanley E. Manahan, General Applied Chemistry 1978, 82, page 474

=== Examples of "limiting" amino acids in plant protein ===
According to WHO, human need for proteins is 0.66 g per kg of bodyweight per day. A 70 kg person has an estimated protein requirement of 46.2 g (70 kg x 0.66 g/kg).

In addition, there is a specific need of essential amino acids quantities. See Essential amino acid#Recommended daily intake for a table of the values; the tables below use a percentage of the requirement.

Rice and chickpeas as protein sources, in 46.2 g of protein (daily requirement)
Amino acid	Amount (mg) in rice protein (612g of whole rice)	% WHO requirement	Amount (mg) in chickpea protein (522g of canned chickpeas)	% WHO requirement
Histidine	1236	176%	1274	182%
Isoleucine	2056	146%	1984	141%
Leucine	4021	144%	3294	118%
Lysine	1854	88%	3095	147%
Methionine	1095	156%	606	87%
Phenylalanine	2509	143%	2479	141%
Threonine	1781	169%	1717	163%
Tryptophan	618	220%	444	158%
Valine	2852	156%	1942	106%

In the above examples, neither whole rice nor canned chickpeas have sufficient amounts of all required amino acids when used as the only source of 46.2 g of daily protein. The insufficient amino acid is called the limiting amino acid: lysine in rice and methionine in chickpeas. Consuming only chickpeas or other plant-based foods that also lack methionine for long periods of time will result in deficiency of the amino acid, and severe health problems will arise.

Rice and chickpeas as separate protein sources, 50-50 ratio (23.1g each)
Amino acid	Amount (mg) in rice protein (~306g of whole rice)	Amount in chickpea protein (~261g of canned chickpeas)	Combined amount (mg)	WHO recommended intake amount (mg), 70 kg	% WHO requirement
Histidine	618	637	1255	700	179%
Isoleucine	1028	992	2020	1400	144%
Leucine	2011	1647	3658	2790	131%
Lysine	927	1548	2475	2100	118%
Methionine	548	303	851	700	122%
Phenylalanine	1254	1240	2494	1750	143%
Threonine	891	858	1749	1050	167%
Tryptophan	309	222	531	280	190%
Valine	1426	971	2397	1820	132%

In the above example, the combination of whole rice and canned chickpeas has no limiting amino acids. This means that consuming only rice and chickpeas, in these specific quantities of 306 g/day and 261 g/day respectively, for long periods of time, would easily combine to create complete protein, as it would not result in any of the essential amino acid deficiency.

As the data of the example show, all essential amino acids are found in a specific plant. However, one or more of them may be limiting. For this reason, vegan and vegetarian diets need to be varied in terms of plants consumed.

== Plant protein research ==
The first biochemist to enter the field was Karl Heinrich Ritthausen, a student of Justus von Liebig. Thomas Burr Osborne continued what Ritthausen started and published The Vegetable Proteins in 1909. Thus Yale University was the early center of protein nutrition, where William Cumming Rose was a student. Osborne also worked to determine the essentials, and later led the Biochemistry Department at the University of Chicago.

When Ritthausen died in 1912, Osborne praised his efforts in biochemistry:

As a result of his later work he proved that wide differences exist between different food proteins; and he was the first to direct attention to this fact, and to discuss its probable bearing on their relative value in nutrition.

Osborne then joined forces with Lafayette Mendel at the Connecticut Agricultural Experiment Station to determine the essential amino acids.

In the 1950s and 1960s, Nevin S. Scrimshaw took this knowledge to India and Guatemala. He designed meals using local vegetables to fight against the scourge of kwashiorkor. In Guatemala he used the combination of cottonseed flour with maize, while in India he combined peanut flour with wheat.

== Popularization ==
In 1954, Adelle Davis published Let's Eat Right to Keep Fit, which described the importance of combining "incomplete" proteins to make "complete" proteins, and advised that any incomplete proteins not complemented within one hour could not be used by the body.

In 1971, Frances Moore Lappé published Diet for a Small Planet, which explained how essential amino acids might be obtained from complementary sources in vegetarian nutrition. The book became a bestseller :

An extension of a one-page handout that Lappé had circulated among her fellow improvisors in Berkeley, Diet for a Small Planet (1971) soon became the vegetarian text of the ecology movement, selling in the next ten years almost two million copies in three editions and six languages.

Lappé wrote:

Complementary protein combinations make for delicious recipes – they are combinations that formed the basis of the world's traditional cuisines. We use them naturally in our cooking without even being aware of it. The three most common complementary protein combinations are:
1. Grains (rice, corn, wheat, barley, etc.) + legumes (peas, beans, lentils)
2. Grains and milk products
3. Seeds (Sesame or sunflower) +legumes

In 1975, both Vogue and American Journal of Nursing carried articles describing the principles and practice of protein combining. For a time, The American National Research Council and the American Dietetic Association (ADA) cautioned vegetarians to be sure to combine their proteins.

Protein combining reached the pages of a general chemistry textbook in 1982:

There is an increased possibility of protein deficiency with a strictly vegetable diet, unless the vegetable sources are carefully combined so that they complement one another.

— Stanley E. Manahan, General Applied Chemistry, second edition, page 473

In 1985, the principle of protein combining was explained by J. Rigó:

The biological value of proteins in general, hence also of grain-proteins, is fundamentally determined by the ratio between the essential amino acids to be found in cereals and the requirement of essential amino acids of the living creature, consuming protein...the most important way of raising the biological value ... [is] given by the technique of complementing.

In 2011 PLOS ONE published an article investigating the specifics of protein combining for 1251 plant-based foods. The bases of reference are the amino acids indispensable to human nutrition, and the ideal proportioning of these amino acids in a meal. They explain, "complementation involves consuming two or more foods together to yield an amino acid pattern that is better than the sum of the two foods alone." In contrast to pairings based on food groups, such as pairing a grain with a bean, the investigators reported that pairing by food group was not supported by their work: "Examining the top 100 pairings for each food, we found no consistent pattern of food group-food group pairings."

== Criticism ==
Protein combining has drawn criticism as an unnecessary complicating factor in nutrition.

In 1981, Frances Moore Lappé changed her position on protein combining from a decade prior in a revised edition of Diet for a Small Planet in which she wrote:

"In 1971 I stressed protein complementarity because I assumed that the only way to get enough protein ... was to create a protein as usable by the body as animal protein. In combating the myth that meat is the only way to get high-quality protein, I reinforced another myth. I gave the impression that in order to get enough protein without meat, considerable care was needed in choosing foods. Actually, it is much easier than I thought.

"With three important exceptions, there is little danger of protein deficiency in a plant food diet. The exceptions are diets very heavily dependent on [1] fruit or on [2] some tubers, such as sweet potatoes or cassava, or on [3] junk food (refined flours, sugars, and fat). Fortunately, relatively few people in the world try to survive on diets in which these foods are virtually the sole source of calories. In all other diets, if people are getting enough calories, they are virtually certain of getting enough protein."

The necessity of protein combining was not asserted. Rather, the increased biological value of meals where proteins are combined was noted. In a concession, Lappé removed from the second edition "charts that indicate exact proportions of complementary proteins".

The American Dietetic Association reversed itself in its 1988 position paper on vegetarianism. Suzanne Havala, the primary author of the paper, recalls the research process:

There was no basis for [protein combining] that I could see.... I began calling around and talking to people and asking them what the justification was for saying that you had to complement proteins, and there was none. And what I got instead was some interesting insight from people who were knowledgeable and actually felt that there was probably no need to complement proteins. So we went ahead and made that change in the paper. [Note: The paper was approved by peer review and by a delegation vote before becoming official.]

In 1994, Vernon Young and Peter Pellett published their paper that became the definitive contemporary guide to protein metabolism in humans. It also confirmed that complementing proteins at meals was totally unnecessary. Thus, people who avoid consuming animal protein do not need to be at all concerned about amino acid imbalances from the plant proteins that make up their usual diets.

While many plant proteins are lower in one or more essential amino acids than animal proteins, especially lysine, and to a lesser extent methionine and threonine, eating a variety of plants can serve as a well-balanced and complete source of amino acids.

In 2009, the American Dietetic Association wrote:

Plant protein can meet protein requirements when a variety of plant foods is consumed and energy needs are met. Research indicates that an assortment of plant foods eaten over the course of a day can provide all essential amino acids and ensure adequate nitrogen retention and use in healthy adults, thus, complementary proteins do not need to be consumed at the same meal.

The American Heart Association now states:

You don't need to eat foods from animals to have enough protein in your diet. Plant proteins alone can provide enough of the essential and non-essential amino acids, as long as sources of dietary protein are varied and caloric intake is high enough to meet energy needs. Whole grains, legumes, vegetables, seeds and nuts all contain both essential and non-essential amino acids. You don't need to consciously combine these foods ("complementary proteins") within a given meal.

Some institutions use the Protein Digestibility Corrected Amino Acid Score to assess diets without consideration of protein combining and hence find the use of combinations to be a challenge to their methodology.
