= T. Colin Campbell =

American biochemist

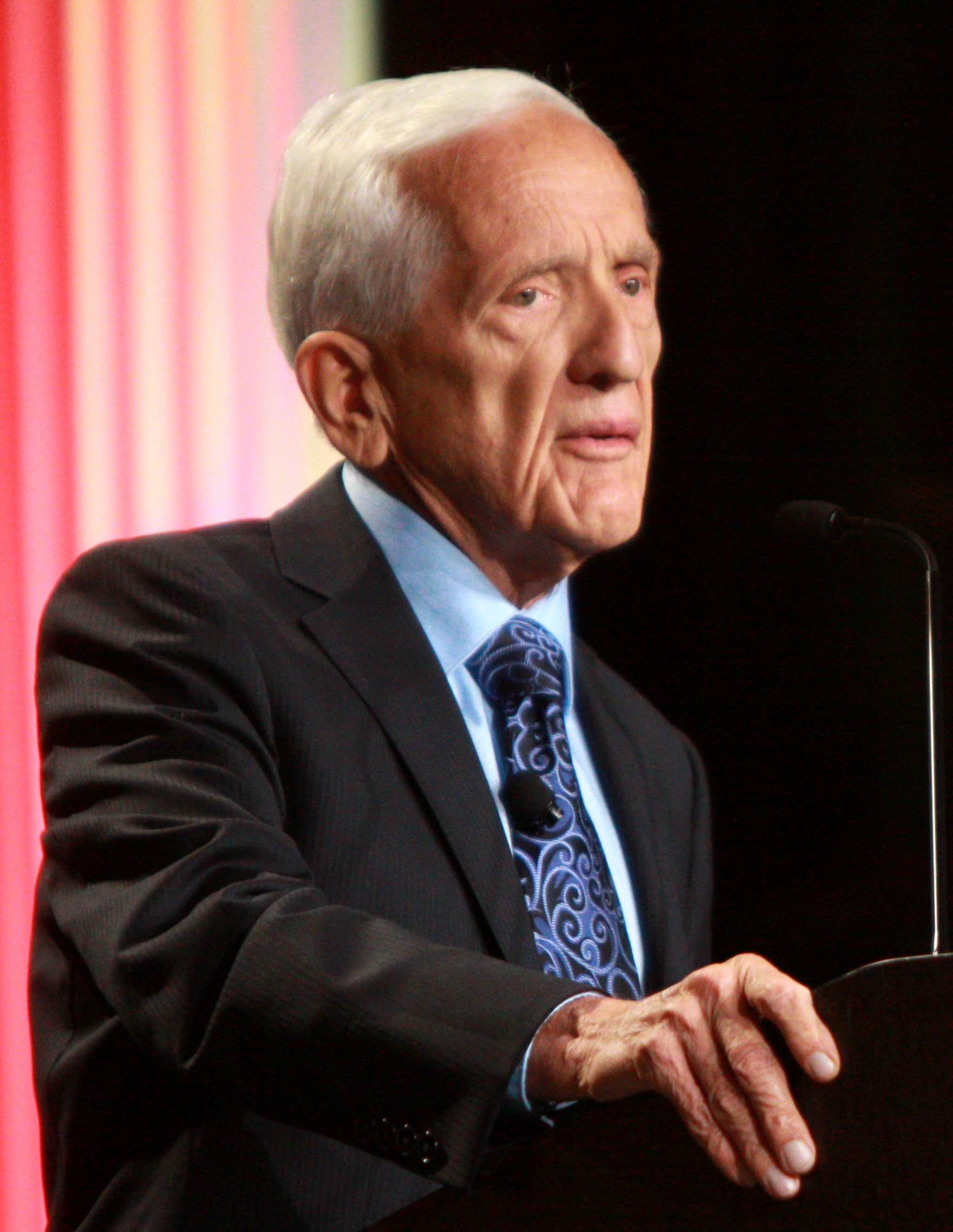
- Campbell speaking in 2013
- Born: March 14, 1934 (age 92)
- Education: Pennsylvania State University (BS); University of Georgia; Cornell University (MS, PhD)
- Occupation: Nutritional biochemist
- Notable work: The China Study (2005)
- Spouse: Karen Campbell
- Children: Thomas M. Campbell, Keith E. Campbell, Nelson Campbell, Daniel I. Campbell (sons) LeAnne Campbell (Daughter)
- Website: T. Colin Campbell Center for Nutrition Studies

Thomas Colin Campbell (born March 14, 1934) is an American biochemist who specializes in the effect of nutrition on long-term health. He is the Jacob Gould Schurman Professor Emeritus of Nutritional Biochemistry at Cornell University.

Campbell has become known for his advocacy of a low-fat, whole-food, plant-based. He coined the term "Plant-based diet" to help present his research on diet at the National Institutes of Health in 1980. He is the author of over 300 research papers, and four books The China Study (2005), which was co-authored with his son, Thomas M. Campbell II, and became one of America's best-selling books about nutrition, Whole (2013), The Low-Carb Fraud (2014) and The Future of Nutrition (2020). Campbell is featured in the 2011 American documentary Forks Over Knives.

Campbell was one of the lead scientists of the China–Cornell–Oxford Project on diet and disease, set up in 1983 by Cornell University, the University of Oxford, and the Chinese Academy of Preventive Medicine to explore the relationship between nutrition and cancer, heart, and metabolic diseases. The study was described by The New York Times as "the Grand Prix of epidemiology".

== Early life and education ==
Campbell grew up on a dairy farm and studied pre-veterinary medicine at Pennsylvania State University, where he obtained his B.S. in 1956, then attended veterinary school at the University of Georgia for a year. Campbell completed his M.S., Ph.D. and MIT (Research Associate) in nutrition, biochemistry and toxicology at Cornell University. He was also a student of Clive McCay, a pioneer in modern biogerontology, known for successfully extending the lifespan of mice through reduced caloric intake and advancing calorie restriction research.

== Career ==
Campbell joined MIT as a research associate, then worked for 10 years in the Virginia Tech Department of Biochemistry and Nutrition, before returning to Cornell in 1975 to join its Division of Nutritional Sciences. He has worked as a senior science adviser to the American Institute for Cancer Research, and sits on the advisory board of the Physicians Committee for Responsible Medicine. He is known in particular for research, derived in part from the China study, that appears to link the consumption of animal protein with the development of cancer and heart disease. Specifically, preliminary results from a large study involving 6,500 people in China showed a reduced risk of cancer, heart disease, diabetes, osteoporosis, and other illnesses among those who followed a plant-based diet. Campbell and his colleagues demonstrated that rats on a diet with 5% casein (a milk protein) developed 75% fewer precancerous lesions in response to a carcinogen compared to those on a diet with 20% casein. He also said that "we could turn on or turn off cancer growth" by increasing or decreasing casein intake. Campbell's book, The China Study, was influential in persuading President Bill Clinton to adopt a vegan diet to lose weight and improve his heart disease.

Campbell has followed a "99% vegan" diet since around 1990. He does not identify himself as a vegetarian or vegan, and uses the term "plant-based" instead because he said, "I didn't do this research to prove that vegetarianism or veganism are good ideas. I wanted the argument to rest on science, not ideology". He told the New York Times: "The idea is that we should be consuming whole foods. We should not be relying on the idea that genes are determinants of our health. We should not be relying on the idea that nutrient supplementation is the way to get nutrition, because it's not. I'm talking about whole, plant-based foods". In 2013, Campbell debated Dr. Eric Westman — co-author of "The New Atkins for a New You", a physician, and an assistant professor at Duke University who supports the Atkins diet. Campbell cited a 2004 study funded by the Atkins Diet company, which found that people on the Atkins diet not only suffered from constipation but also experienced higher rates of bad breath, headaches, muscle cramps, and diarrhea. He has been a member since 1978 of several United States National Academy of Sciences expert panels on food safety, and holds an honorary professorship at the Chinese Academy of Preventive Medicine. Campbell is also on the advisory board of Naked Food magazine.

== Related media ==
Campbell is featured in the documentaries, Diet for a New America, Forks Over Knives, Planeat, Vegucated, and PlantPure Nation, a film produced by Campbell's son, Nelson Campbell. In 2024, Variety magazine reported that Oscar-winning director David S. Ward would direct a biopic about Campbell.

== Charity ==
He is the founder of the T. Colin Campbell Center for Nutrition Studies, a 501(c)(3) organization, which was created to provide education about the whole food, plant based diet Campbell recommends. The Center partners with eCornell to provide an online course which is the focus of the education programs. Campbell is the president of the board of directors for the Center.

== Bibliography ==
Type	Title	Year	Publisher	Identifier	Ref.
Books	Diet, Life-Style, and Mortality in China: A Study of the Characteristics of 65 Chinese Counties	1990	Cornell University Press; Oxford University Press	Cornell: ISBN 978-0-19-261843-6; Oxford: ISBN 978-0-19-261843-6	
Books	The China Study	2005	BenBella Books	Paperback: ISBN 978-1-932100-66-2; Hardcover: ISBN 978-1-932100-38-9	
Books	Whole: Rethinking the Science of Nutrition	2013	BenBella Books	Paperback: ISBN 978-1-939529-84-8; Hardcover: ISBN 978-1-937856-24-3	
Books	The Low-Carb Fraud	2014	BenBella Books	Hardcover: ISBN 978-1-940363-09-7	
Books	The Future of Nutrition: An Insider's Look at the Science, Why We Keep Getting It Wrong, and How to Start Getting It Right	2020	BenBella Books	Paperback: ISBN 978-1-953295-81-1; Hardcover: ISBN 978-1-950665-70-9	

== Accolades ==
Organizations	Year	Category	Result	Ref.
American College of Lifestyle Medicine	2018	Lifetime Achievement Award	Won	
American Institute for Cancer Research	1998	Award for Excellence in Cancer Research	Won	
Miami University	2015	James Robeson Junior Faculty Research Excellence Award	Won	
The Plantrician Project	2014	Plantrician Project Luminary Award	Won	
