= Chili, Ohio =

Chili
- Unincorporated community
- Location within the state of Ohio
- Coordinates: 40°22′26″N 81°45′14″W
- Country: United States
- State: Ohio
- County: Coshocton
- Elevation: 810 ft (250 m)
- Time zone: UTC-5 (Eastern (EST))
  - Summer (DST): UTC-4 (EDT)
- GNIS feature ID: 1048600

Chili is an unincorporated community in Crawford Township, Coshocton County, Ohio, United States.

== History ==
Chili originally grew up around a blacksmith shop which was established there. The community was platted in 1834. A post office opened under the name Winklepeck's in 1834, the name was changed to Chili in 1838, and the post office closed in 1908. The distinguished surgeon George Washington Crile was born in Chili.
