= George Crile III =

American journalist (1945-2006)

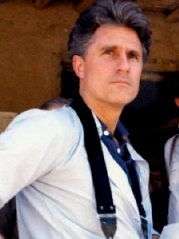
- Crile in Afghanistan
- Born: George Washington Crile III; March 5, 1945; Cleveland, Ohio, U.S.
- Died: May 15, 2006 (aged 61); Manhattan, New York, U.S.
- Education: Trinity College; Georgetown University
- Occupations: Journalist; producer
- Television: CBS News; 60 Minutes; 60 Minutes II
- Relatives: Rip Esselstyn (nephew)
- Awards: Emmy Award; Peabody Award; Edward R. Murrow Award; American Film Festival Blue Ribbon

George Washington Crile III (March 5, 1945 – May 15, 2006) was an American journalist most closely associated with his three decades of work at CBS News. He specialized in dangerous and controversial subjects, resulting in both praise and controversy. He received an Emmy Award, Peabody Award, and Edward R. Murrow Award.

== Early life and education ==
Crile was born March 5, 1945, in Cleveland, Ohio. He was the son of Jane Murphy (née Halle; 1909–1963) and George "Barney" Crile Jr. (1907–1992). His father was a leading figure in the United States in challenging unnecessary surgery, best known for his part in eliminating radical breast surgery. His mother died of breast cancer. His stepmother was Helga Sandburg (1918–2014), daughter of Carl Sandburg. His grandfather, Dr. George Washington Crile, was a founder of the Cleveland Clinic and a pioneer of modern medical surgery.

He attended Trinity College, graduating with a bachelor's degree in 1968. There, he was a member of the fraternity St. Anthony Hall. He also attended the School of Foreign Service at Georgetown University and the Defense Language Institute's Foreign Language Center at Monterey, California.

From 1968 to 1974, He served in the United States Marine Corps Reserve as a lance corporal.

== Career ==
After college, he became a reporter for the Gary Post-Tribune in Indiana and was assigned to The Pentagon beat in the early 1970s. When he left the newspaper, he was a reporter for Washington columnists Drew Pearson and Jack Anderson, and was The Pentagon correspondent for Knight-Ridder newspapers.

Crile was Washington editor of Harper's Magazine from 1973 to 1976. He also wrote for The Washington Monthly, New Times, The New York Times, The Washington Monthly, and The Washington Post Outlook Section.

=== CBS Producer ===
Crile joined CBS News in 1976 to produce The CIA's Secret Army, his trail-breaking documentary that chronicled the previously untold story of the CIA's secret wars against Castro after the Bay of Pigs Invasion. It won an American Film Festival Blue Ribbon. Historian Henry Steele Commager wrote that it would go down as one of the most important journalistic reports in U.S. American history.

It was the first of a collection of broadcasts based on Crile's reporting, in which he took viewers into previously closed and inaccessible worlds. Among his notable documentary reports were The Battle for South Africa, which won a Peabody Award and an Emmy Award. The Uncounted Enemy: A Vietnam Deception aired on January 23, 1982, and alleged that General William Westmoreland had purposely underestimated the number of enemy troops in the Vietnam War. Westmoreland responded by bringing a $120 million libel lawsuit. After an eighteen-week trial, Westmoreland and CBS settled out of court with what the former considered an apology—money was not involved in the settlement, and CBS stood by its story. David Boies, representing CBS and Crile, credited Crile’s "unflappable testimony under cross-examination with effectively ending the trial."

Crile was embroiled in another controversy following the 1980 CBS Reports program "Gay Power, Gay Politics", which he reported, wrote, and co-produced. The program focused on gay politics in San Francisco following the assassination of openly gay supervisor Harvey Milk in 1978. It was widely denounced as manipulative and dishonest, a view partially upheld by the National News Council, an industry self-policing body not known for its willingness to criticize the networks.

When 60 Minutes II premiered, it included his story on Krasnoyarsk-26, a secret city built inside a mountain in Siberia which had nuclear reactors.

=== CBS Reporter ===
In 1985, Crile joined 60 Minutes, where he produced scores of reports with Mike Wallace, Ed Bradley and Harry Reasoner and established his credentials as a specialist in coverage of international affairs. His initial 60 Minutes report, revealing the Soviet nuclear command's willingness to consider halting the targeting of the United States, played a significant role in helping set up a summit between the United States and Soviet nuclear commanders. His numerous reports from inside the deadly secret worlds of Russia and the United States appeared on 60 Minutes and 60 Minutes II as well as an hour-long documentary for CNN. The Overseas Press Club twice awarded him the Edward R. Murrow Award for these broadcasts.

His broadcast subjects included reports on:

- The revolution in Haiti
- The battle over the Panama Canal
- Three Mile Island
- US Cuban policy
- The Afghan War
- The Iran-Contra affair
- Sandinistas in Nicaragua
- General Singlaub and the World Anti Communist League
- Prince Bandar and the special U.S. Saudi connection
- African National Congress
- America's losing war on drugs
- The search for Archbishop Romero’s murderers.
- Jonas Savimbi and the US backing of UNITA
- Gulf War
- USS Harlan County incident
- CIA's man in Havana
- Rwandan geniocide
- The unsung heroes of the US military campaign in El Salvador
- The KGB and the world of Soviet Intelligence
- Russia and America's nuclear arsenals

After the September 11 attacks, Crile repeatedly drew on his extensive experience and contacts in Afghanistan, Pakistan and the Near East to provide behind the scenes look into the worlds of Osama bin Laden and militant Islam.

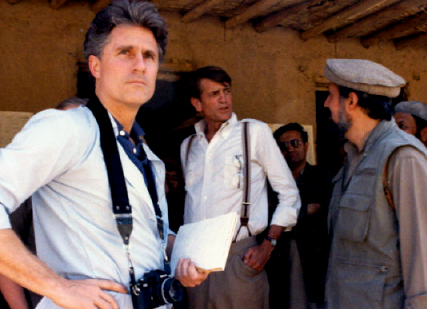
Crile with Charlie Wilson in Afghanistan

=== Charlie Wilson's War ===
In the late 1980s, Crile began the research and reporting on the Afghan War that led to his 2003 best-selling book, Charlie Wilson's War: The Extraordinary Story of the Largest Covert Operation in History, which tells the story of how the United States funded the only successful jihad in modern history, the CIA's secret war in Afghanistan that was intended to give the Soviet Union their own Vietnam. The support for these jihad leaders was channeled through Pakistan, leading to the creation of a new threat to the United States and its allies—which Crile claimed to have foreseen.

Charlie Wilson’s War has been widely and favorably reviewed and spent months on The New York Times best seller list. It was the basis of the Tom Hanks/Mike Nichols film, Charlie Wilson's War, which was released by Universal Studios in December 2007.

== Personal life ==
He married Anne Patton, but that marriage ended in divorce. They had two daughters: Katy Crile and Molly Crile. His second wife was Susan Lyne, former President of ABC Entertainment and former CEO of Martha Stewart Living Omnimedia. Their children include Susan Crile and Jane Crile.

Crile died May 15, 2006, at age 61 at his home in New York City from pancreatic cancer. His papers are housed at the Dolph Briscoe Center for American History at the University of Texas Austin.
