= George Crile Jr. =

American physician

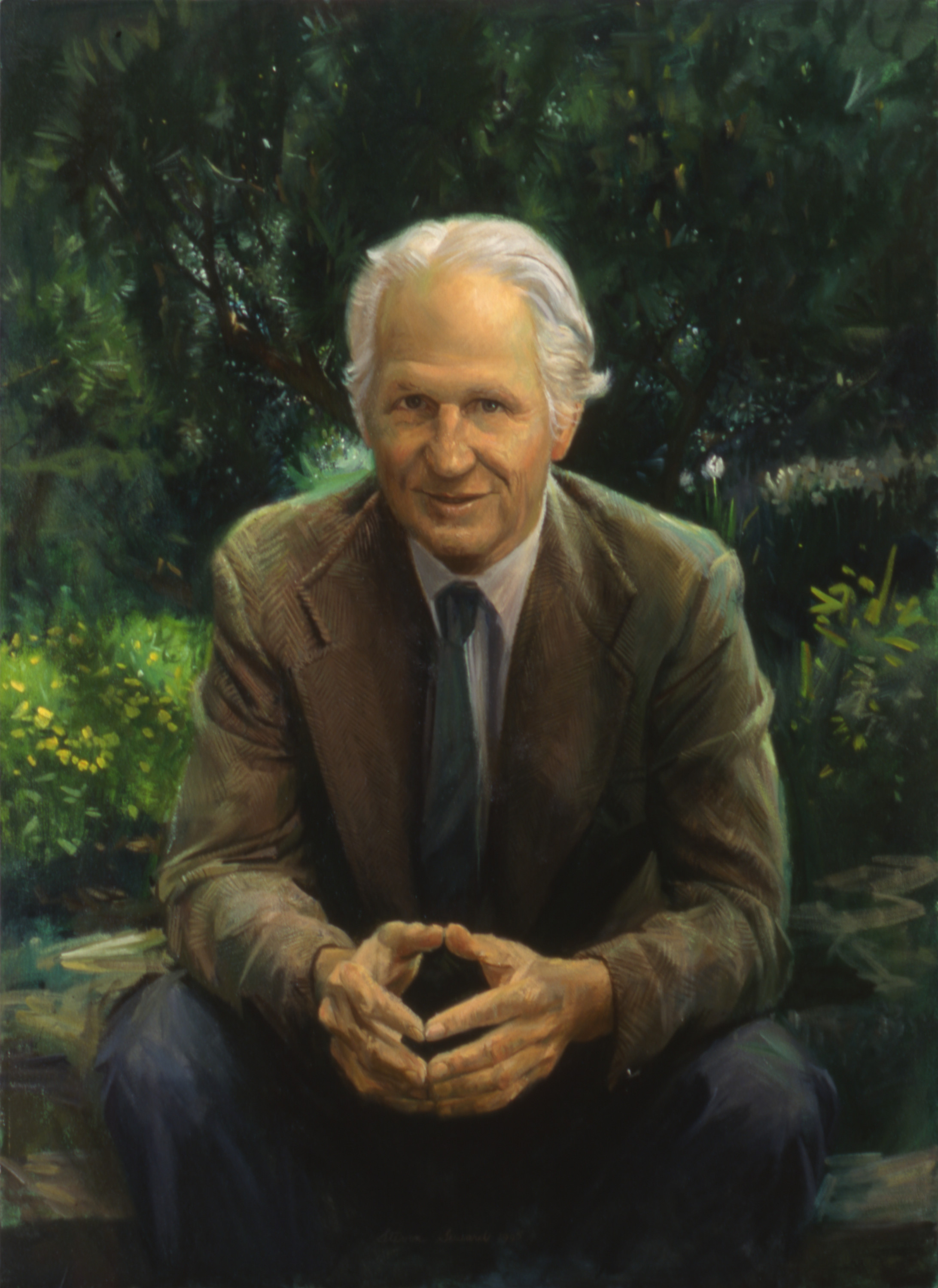
Portrait painting of Dr. George Crile at the Cleveland Clinic, by Steven Christopher Seward, 1995

George Washington "Barney" Crile Jr. (November 3, 1907 – September 11, 1992) was an American surgeon. He was a significant influence on how breast cancer is treated and was a visible and controversial advocate for alternative procedures, now considered normal treatments. He worked at the Cleveland Clinic for more than fifty years.

== Early life ==
Crile was born in Cleveland, Ohio on November 3, 1907. He was the son of famous surgeon, George Washington Crille, a founding partner of the Cleveland Clinic.

After attending the University School and the Hotchkiss School, Crile attended Yale University, where he was on the football and track teams and was a member of Skull and Bones. He graduated in 1929. He earned his M.D. from Harvard Medical School in 1933, graduating summa cum laude and first in his class.

== Career ==
After graduating Crile chose to intern at the Barnes Hospital (1933–34) under surgeon Evarts Ambrose Graham, noted for successfully removing a lung from a cancer patient. He spent the rest of his medical career at the Cleveland Clinic. After his residency there (1934–1937), he joined the surgical staff in 1937, served as head of the general surgery department (1956–1969), senior consultant (1969–1972), and emeritus consultant (1972–1992).

During World War II, he served in the US Navy (1942–46), stationed at naval hospitals in San Diego and New Zealand. While in the Navy he researched on ruptured appendixes and discovered that they were not as life-threatening as once believed. He, therefore, concluded that risky emergency appendectomies on board submarines may harm the patient more than help, and that the safer option was to employ penicillin until the patient could be evacuated to a superior hospital facility. He also developed a procedure for pilonidal cysts, draining them with a catheter instead of the standard surgical excision. He later said "I came home from World War II convinced that operations in many fields of surgery were either too radical, or not even necessary. Universal acceptance of a procedure does not necessarily make it right."

Crile turned his willingness to question orthodox procedures to breast cancer. The traditional treatment for breast cancer was a radical mastectomy, a procedure that removes the entire breast as well as surrounding muscle, tissue, and lymph nodes. Under the influence of Scottish surgeon Reginald Murley as well as one of his colleagues at the Cleveland Clinic, he instead began to advocate procedures that removed much less material, a simple mastectomy, which only removes the breast, and a lumpectomy, which removes only a small amount of tissue. Crile performed his final radical mastectomy in 1954 and became a public advocate of alternative procedures, which are now standard. In 1955, he published an article, "A Plea Against the Blind Fear of Cancer", in Life magazine and a book, Cancer and Common Sense. The medical establishment was resistant to the changes he advocated so he sought to influence them through their patients. He was an outspoken critic of traditional procedures for decades and some of his patients, including author Babette Rosmond, became public advocates as well.

He retired as head of the Cleveland Clinic's Department of General Surgery in 1968, continuing as a senior consultant.

== Personal life ==
Crile married Jane Halle in 1935. She died of cancer in 1963. They had three daughters and one son, CBS News producer George Crile III. Their daughter Ann Crile married surgeon Caldwell Esselstyn and is the mother of author Rip Esselstyn. In 1963, Crile married his second wife, Helga Sandburg, the daughter of the poet Carl Sandburg.

Crile died of lung cancer in Cleveland Clinic on September 11, 1992.

== Popular Media ==
A portrait of Dr. George Crile Jr. at the Cleveland Clinic was featured in the movie Miracle Dogs in 2003. At approximately the 30-minute mark, the character Katherine Mannion (played by actress Rue McClanahan) talks to the painting, as it is implied to be her deceased husband. The movie was filmed partly on location at the Cleveland Clinic.

== Selected publications ==
Crile was an avid author on many subjects, especially medicine, and travel. He had a weekly radio program in the 1980s called 90 Seconds on WERE.

- The Hospital Care of the Surgical Patient: A Surgeon's Handbook (with Franklin L. Shively Jr.), C. C Thomas, 1943
- Practical Aspects of Thyroid Disease, Saunders, 1949.
- Treasure-Diving Holidays (with Jane Crile), Viking, 1954.
- Cancer and Common Sense, Viking, 1955.
- More Than Booty (with Jane Crile), McGraw, 1965.
- A Biological Consideration of Treatment of Breast Cancer, C. C Thomas, 1967.
- A Naturalistic View of Man: The Importance of Early Training in Learning, Living, and the Organization of Society, World Publishing, 1969.
- Above and Below: A Journey Through Our National Underwater Parks (with Helga Sandburg), McGraw, 1969.
- What Women Should Know About the Breast Cancer Controversy, Macmillan, 1973.
- Surgery, Your Choices, Your Alternatives, Delacorte, 1978.
- The Way It Was: Sex, Surgery, Treasure, and Travel, 1907–1987, Kent State University Press, 1992.
