= China–Cornell–Oxford Project =

1980s observational study on diet in China

The China–Cornell–Oxford Project, short for the "China-Oxford-Cornell Study on Dietary, Lifestyle and Disease Mortality Characteristics in 65 Rural Chinese Counties," was a large observational study conducted throughout the 1980s in rural China, a partnership between Cornell University, the University of Oxford, and the government of China. The study compared the health consequences of diets rich in animal-based foods to diets rich in plant-based foods among people who were genetically similar. In May 1990, The New York Times termed the study "the Grand Prix of epidemiology".

== Background ==
The idea for the study began in 1980–81 during discussions between T. Colin Campbell at Cornell University and Chen Junshi, Deputy Director of Institute of Nutrition and Food Hygiene at the Chinese Academy of Preventive Medicine. They were later joined by Richard Peto of the University of Oxford—Professor of Medical Statistics and Epidemiology as of 2012—and Li Junyao of the China Cancer Institute.

== Studies ==
In 1983 two villages were chosen at random in each of 65 rural counties in China, and 50 families were chosen at random in each village for a total of 6,500 people. The dietary habits of one adult member of each family were examined—half male, half female—and the results compared to the death rates in those counties from around 48 forms of cancers and other diseases during 1973–1975.

The first two major studies were led by T. Colin Campbell, professor of nutritional biochemistry at Cornell, who summarized the results in his book, The China Study (2005). Other lead researchers were Chen Junshi, Deputy Director of Institute of Nutrition and Food Hygiene at the Chinese Academy of Preventive Medicine in Beijing, Richard Peto of the University of Oxford, and Li Junyao of the China Cancer Institute.

== See also ==
- Busselton Health Study
- Caerphilly Heart Disease Study
- Framingham Heart Study
