= The China Study =

2005 book by T. Colin Campbell and Thomas M. Campbell II

- Author: T. Colin Campbell, Ph.D. and Thomas M. Campbell II, M.D.
- Subject: Nutritional science
- Publisher: BenBella Books
- Publication date: 2005. (Revised and Expanded Edition is 2016.)
- Publication place: United States
- Pages: 417 (first edition)
- ISBN: 1-932100-38-5
- Website: www.benbellavegan.com/book/the-china-study/

The China Study: The Most Comprehensive Study of Nutrition Ever Conducted and the Startling Implications for Diet, Weight Loss and Long-term Health is a book by T. Colin Campbell and his son, Thomas M. Campbell II. The book argues for health benefits of a whole-food, plant-based diet. It was first published in the United States in January 2005 and had sold over one million copies as of October 2013, making it one of America's best-selling books about nutrition.

== Synopsis ==
The China Study examines the link between the consumption of animal products (including dairy) and chronic illnesses such as coronary heart disease, diabetes, breast cancer, prostate cancer, and bowel cancer. The book is "loosely based" on the China–Cornell–Oxford Project, a 20-year study that looked at mortality rates from cancer and other chronic diseases from 1973 to 1975 in 65 counties in China, and correlated this data with 1983–84 dietary surveys and blood work from 100 people in each county.

The authors conclude that people who eat a predominantly whole-food, vegan diet—avoiding animal products as a source of nutrition, including beef, pork, poultry, fish, eggs, cheese, and milk, and reducing their intake of processed foods and refined carbohydrates—will escape, reduce, or reverse the development of numerous diseases. They write that "eating foods that contain any cholesterol above 0 mg is unhealthy." The book recommends sunshine exposure or dietary supplements to maintain adequate levels of vitamin D, and supplements of vitamin B_{12} in case of complete avoidance of animal products. It criticizes low-carb diets, such as the Atkins diet, which include restrictions on the percentage of calories derived from carbohydrates. The authors are critical of reductionist approaches to the study of nutrition, whereby certain nutrients are blamed for disease, as opposed to studying patterns of nutrition and the interactions between nutrients.

== Central argument ==
On p. 61 The China Study observes male all-cancer rates varying 20-fold in different parts of China, while the female all-cancer rates vary 14-fold. Some cancer types vary more than 100 fold over China. Also the average pre 1985 all-cancer rates are much lower in China than in e.g. the USA. In one of his interviews, Campbell explains that causal inference of these differences results from multiple animal experiments by multiple researchers demonstrating such differences being the result of a causal process.

This evidence construction is very similar to animal experiments demonstrating tobacco having cancer causal properties and hence leaving little doubt of the observed lung cancer and tobacco associations in human cohorts also being causal.

== Publication ==
The book was first published in 2005. A revised and expanded edition was published in 2016. The book has also been published in German, Polish, Czech, Slovenian, Italian, Chinese, Japanese, Korean, Romanian, Swedish and Urdu.

=== Companion volumes ===
- Campbell, Thomas (2015). The Campbell Plan: the simple way to lose weight and reverse illness, using the China Study's whole-food, plant-based diet. Rodale Books. ISBN 978-1-62336-410-6.
- Campbell, Thomas (2016). The China study solution: the simple way to lose weight and reverse illness, using a whole-food, plant-based diet. Rodale Books. ISBN 978-1-62336-757-2.
- Campbell, LeAnne; Campbell, T. Colin; Disla, Steven Campbell (2013). The China study cookbook: over 120 whole-food, plant-based recipes. BenBella Books. ISBN 978-1-937856-76-2.

== Reception ==
Sanjay Gupta, CNN's chief medical correspondent, said in his documentary The Last Heart Attack in 2011 that The China Study had changed the way people all over the world eat. Former American president Bill Clinton became a supporter when he adopted a plant-based diet after a heart attack.

Wilfred Niels Arnold, professor of biochemistry at the University of Kansas Medical Center, reviewed the book in Leonardo reviews in 2005: "[T]he authors anticipate resistant and hostile sources, sail on with escalating enthusiasm, and furnish a working hypothesis that is valuable. In fact, the surprising data are difficult to interpret in any other way."

Harriet Hall, writing for Science-Based Medicine, said that the book had references that do not support directly the claims made by the authors and that it did not explain the exceptions to his data, such as high rates of stomach cancer in China.

Stephan Guyenet reviewing the book for Red Pen Reviews commented that The China Study is a "scholarly and well-written book" but three of its key scientific claims are "not very well supported overall".

== See also ==
- Calorie restriction
- Forks Over Knives
- Nurses' Health Study
- Nutritionism
- Vegan nutrition
- List of vegan and plant-based media
