= Whole-food, plant-based diet =

Dietary pattern focused on unrefined plant foods

Whole-food, plant-based diet (WFPB diet) refers to a type of plant-based diet that is entirely composed of fiber rich whole or minimally processed plant foods, (vegetables, fruits, legumes, whole grains, nuts and seeds), while avoiding all animal products and ultra-processed foods.

The term is generally used to distinguish itself from vegan diets that eschew all animal products but include ultra-processed foods, or other forms of plant-based diets which may include either animal products or ultra-processed foods.

== Terminology ==
A whole-food, plant-based diet combines two dietary concepts: an emphasis on foods derived from plants and an emphasis on foods that are whole or minimally processed. Foods commonly emphasized include complex carbohydrates such as vegetables, fruits, legumes, whole grains, nuts and seeds. Foods commonly limited include refined or simple carbohydrates, added sugars, and oils. Foods commonly avoided include animal products and ultra-processed foods.

The term should not be confused with whole food, a broader food-processing concept that is not limited to plant foods.

Definitions of plant-based diets vary in the scientific literature. Some studies use the term to refer to vegan diets, while others include vegetarian, semi-vegetarian or other dietary patterns with varying amounts of animal products. The phrase "whole-food, plant-based" is therefore used by some authors to describe a more specific dietary pattern with an emphasis on minimally processed plant foods.

=== Differentiation from vegan and vegetarian diets ===
A whole-food, plant-based diet may overlap with vegan or vegetarian diets, but the terms are not identical. Vegan diets exclude animal products, while vegetarian diets exclude meat but includes dairy products (and may include eggs). A whole-food, plant-based diet is primarily defined by its emphasis on whole or minimally processed plant foods and by its exclusion of ultra-processed foods.

== Nutritional considerations ==
People following diets that exclude animal products require a reliable source of Vitamin B12, such as fortified foods or supplements. Additional use of supplements may be applied to calcium, iron, vitamin D, and Omega−3 fatty acids depending on food choices and individual circumstances.

== Health research ==
Whole-food, plant-based diets and related low-fat plant-based dietary patterns have been studied in relation to cardiovascular risk factors, body weight, type 2 diabetes and other chronic disease outcomes. Because definitions of plant-based diets vary across studies, findings are not always directly comparable, and health claims should be interpreted in relation to the specific dietary pattern studied.

== See also ==
- Forks Over Knives
- How Not to Die (book)
- Lifestyle medicine
- The China Study (book)
