= George Washington Crile =

American surgeon and co-founder of Cleveland Clinic

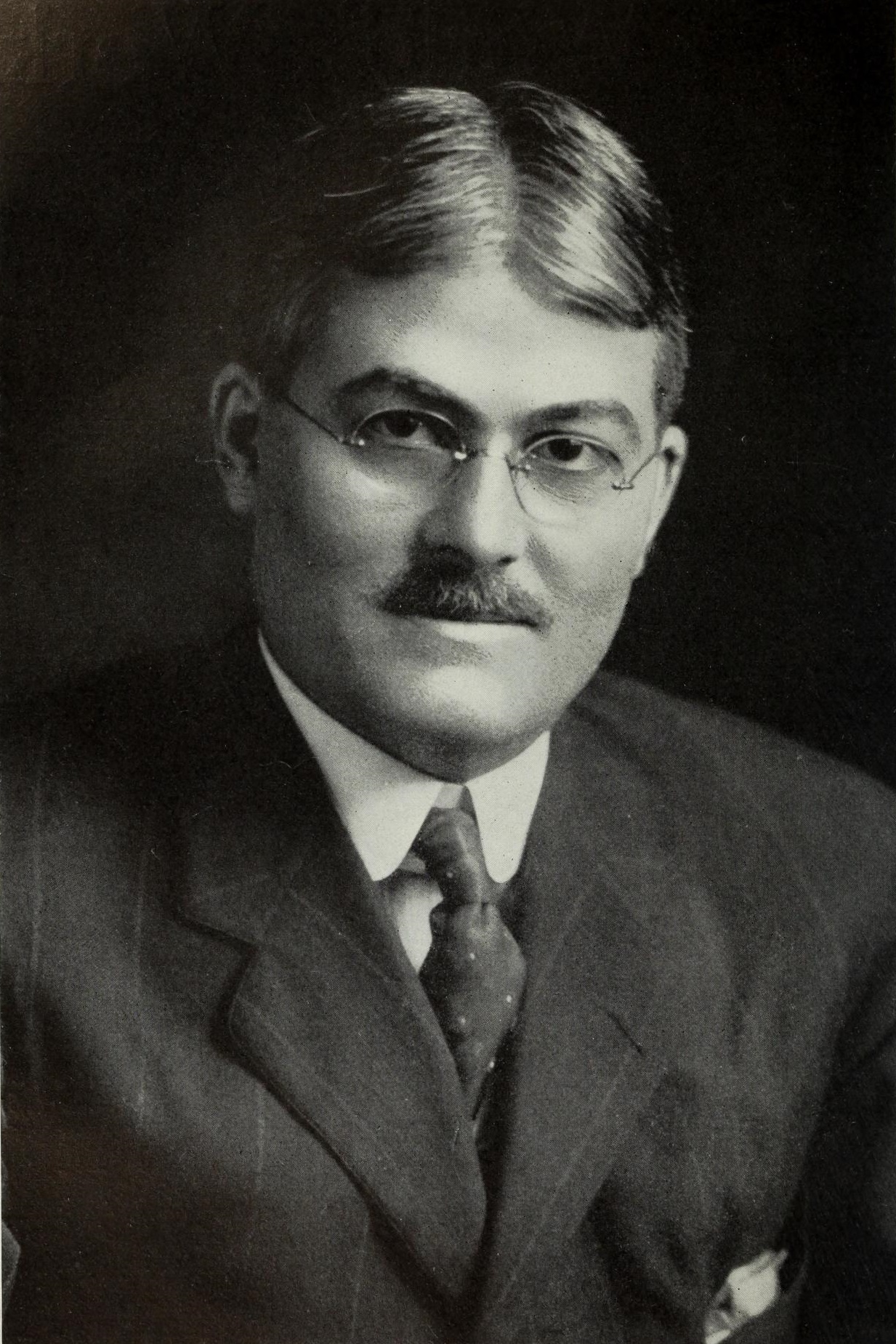
- George Washington Crile
- Born: November 11, 1864; Chili, Ohio, U.S.
- Died: January 7, 1943 (aged 78); Cleveland, Ohio, U.S.
- Resting place: Lake View Cemetery, Cleveland, Ohio, U.S.
- Education: Ohio Northern University; Wooster Medical College (now part of Case Western Reserve University School of Medicine
- Known for: Co-founding the Cleveland Clinic
- Children: George Crile, Jr.
- Relatives: George Crile III (grandson), Rip Esselstyn (great-grandson)
- Scientific career
- Fields: Surgery

George Washington Crile (November 11, 1864 – January 7, 1943) was an American surgeon. Crile is now formally recognized as the first surgeon to have succeeded in a direct blood transfusion. He contributed to other procedures, such as neck dissection. Crile designed a small hemostatic forceps which bears his name; the Crile mosquito clamp. He also described a technique for using opioids, regional anesthesia and general anesthesia which is a concept known as balanced anesthesia. He is also known for co-founding the Cleveland Clinic in 1921.

== Early life ==
Crile was born in Chili, Ohio. He graduated from Ohio Northern University in 1885. In 1887, he received his M.D. from Wooster Medical College which merged to form modern day Case Western Reserve University School of Medicine. He did further study at Vienna, London and Paris.

== Career ==
He taught at Wooster from 1889 to 1900. He was professor of clinical medicine at Western Reserve University from 1900 to 1911, and was then made professor of surgery. He was chair of surgery at Lakeside Hospital from 1910 to 1924. Crile was responsible for whole blood transfusion, in 1906, and he spurred the use of the new X-ray machines.

During the Spanish–American War, he was made a member of the Medical Reserve Corps and served in Puerto Rico (1898). He was made an honorable F.R.C.S. (London) in 1913. After America entered World War I, he became a major in the medical O.T.C., and professional director (1917–18). He served with the British Expeditionary Force (B.E.F.) in France and was senior consultant in surgical research (1918–19). He was made lieutenant-colonel in June 1918, and colonel later in the year.

He made important contributions to the study of blood pressure and of shock in operations. Realizing that any strong emotion, such as fear before operation, produced shock, he attempted to allay dread by psychic suggestion, also endeavouring to prevent the subjective shock which affects the patient, even when under general anaesthesia, by first anaesthetizing the operative region with cocaine for several days, if necessary, before operating. Thus nerve communication between the affected part and the brain was already obstructed when the general anaesthetic was administered. For his work in shockless surgery he received a gold medal from the National Institute of Social Sciences in 1917.

He was one of the founders of the American Association for Cancer Research in 1907.

When he retired from the Medical School at age 65, Crile went into private practice and worked with those establishing the new Cleveland Clinic.

== Publications ==
- Surgical Shock (1897)
- On the Blood Pressure in Surgery (1903)
- Hemorrhage and Transfusion (1909)
- Surgical Anemia and Resuscitation (1914)
- The Origin and Nature of the Emotions (1915)
- A Mechanistic View of War and Peace (1917).
- Man an Adaptive Mechanism (1916) The Fallacy of the German State Philosophy (1918)
- The Surgical Treatment of Hypertension (1938)

== Honors ==
- Crile was elected to the American Philosophical Society in 1912
- In World War II, the United States Liberty ship SS George Crile was named in his honor.
- The U.S. Army's Crile General Hospital in Cleveland, Ohio was named in his honor on 21 April 1944.
- The lunar crater Crile is named after him.

== Personal life ==
He married Grace Elizabeth McBride (1876–1948), a sister of David Reed. His son, George Crile Jr., was also a surgeon. His grandson George Crile III was a journalist, author, and CBS producer.

He died on January 7, 1943, in Cleveland. He is buried in Lake View Cemetery in Cleveland, Ohio.
