= What the Health =

2017 documentary film

- Film poster
- Directed by: Kip Andersen; Keegan Kuhn
- Written by: Kip Andersen; Keegan Kuhn
- Produced by: Kip Andersen; Keegan Kuhn
- Starring: Neal Barnard; Tia Blanco; David Carter; Garth Davis; Caldwell Esselstyn; Michael Greger; Michael Klaper; Susan M. Levin; John McDougall; Toni Okamoto; Ryan Shapiro; Timothy Shieff; Michele Simon; Steve-O; Kim A. Williams
- Cinematography: Keegan Kuhn
- Edited by: Kip Andersen; Keegan Kuhn; Ali Tabrizi (assistant)
- Music by: Kip Andersen; Keegan Kuhn; Fernando Arce
- Distributed by: A.U.M. Films & Media
- Release date: March 7, 2017 (New York)
- Running time: 92 minutes
- Country: United States
- Language: English

What the Health is a 2017 American documentary film that advocates for a plant-based diet. It critiques the health effects of meat, dairy product and egg consumption, and questions the practices of leading health and pharmaceutical organizations. Some have also criticized the film, arguing that there are scientific inaccuracies.

== Synopsis ==
Advertised as "The Health Film That Health Organizations Don't Want You To See", the film follows Kip Andersen as he interviews physicians and other individuals on diet and health topics. Andersen is also shown attempting to contact representatives of various health organizations, but comes away dissatisfied with their responses. Through other interviews he examines the alleged connection between the meat, dairy, and pharmaceutical industries, as well as various health organizations. The synopsis is that serious health problems are a consequence of consuming meat and dairy products, and that a conspiracy exists to cover this up.

== Production ==
What the Health was written, produced, and directed by Kip Andersen and Keegan Kuhn, the same production team behind the documentary Cowspiracy. It was executive-produced by Joaquin Phoenix, a long-time vegan.

What the Health was funded via an Indiegogo campaign in March 2016, raising more than $235,000. The film was released globally on Vimeo on March 16, 2017, and screenings licensed through Tugg Inc.

== Reception ==
VegNews listed it as one of "The 18 Best Vegan Documentaries to Start Streaming Now " in 2024. Medical doctors, dietitians, and investigative journalists have criticized the film.

- On July 11, 2017, Harriet Hall, a medical doctor and scientific skeptic known as the SkepDoc, reviewed the documentary on Science-Based Medicine. Hall wrote that "What the Health espouses the fairy tale that all major diseases... can be prevented and cured by eliminating meat and dairy from the diet. It is a blatant polemic for veganism, biased and misleading, and is not a reliable source of scientific information." At the end of her article, she agrees there are health benefits associated with increased plant consumption, but also notes "the evidence is insufficient to recommend that everyone adopt a vegan diet" and "we needn't entirely reject all animal foods". Finally, she recommends moderation in all things.
- On July 20, 2017, Martijn Katan, emeritus professor in nutrition from Vrije Universiteit Amsterdam, called the film "propaganda". Katan says What the Health? exaggerates the health risks of meat, eggs and dairy, and dangerously claims veganism prevents or cures many diseases, like cancer or diabetes. However, he stressed lowered average meat consumption would offer health benefits, and also noted veganism can be a healthy lifestyle for all but young children if care is taken to obtain nutrients. Katan also agreed veganism is in many ways good for the environment.
- Sarah Berry, Lifestyle Health Editor for The Sydney Morning Herald, remarked that in the film "truths sit alongside distortions of truth, skewing our perception of what is and is not fact." Berry goes on to say the film, made by vegan activists, shows provocative images, uses emotive arguments, and sensationalizes the subject. Berry also wrote: "The makers cherry-pick science, use biased sources, distort study findings and use 'weak-to-non-existent data ...'" Berry quoted Dr. Joanna McMillan as saying that "To me it's the usual product of those who are filmmakers and not nutrition scientists or trained in any aspect of medicine or science, therefore not trained or qualified to make sense of scientific research."
- On August 8, 2017, Chase Purdy in Quartz declared: "By cherry-picking nutrition studies to make rickety claims, the makers of What the Health risk ratcheting up fear of certain foods based on weak science. It's not a responsible way to try and change people's behavior, and it does a disservice to nutritional scientists in the field."

== Awards ==
- 2018 Cinema for Peace Award Nominee, Most Valuable Documentary of the Year

== Book ==
A companion book of the same name was released in February 2017, authored by Eunice Wong.

== See also ==
- List of vegan and plant-based media
