= Susan Levin =

Susan Levin may refer to:

- Susan B. Levin, American philosopher
- Susan Bass Levin, president and CEO of Cooper University Health System's Cooper Foundation
- Susan M. Levin (1971–2022), American registered dietitian
- Susan Downey, née Levin, producer
- Susan Tepper, née Levin, American neo-expressionist and figurative painter
