= Howard Lyman =

American farmer and animal rights activist (1938–2026)

Howard F. Lyman
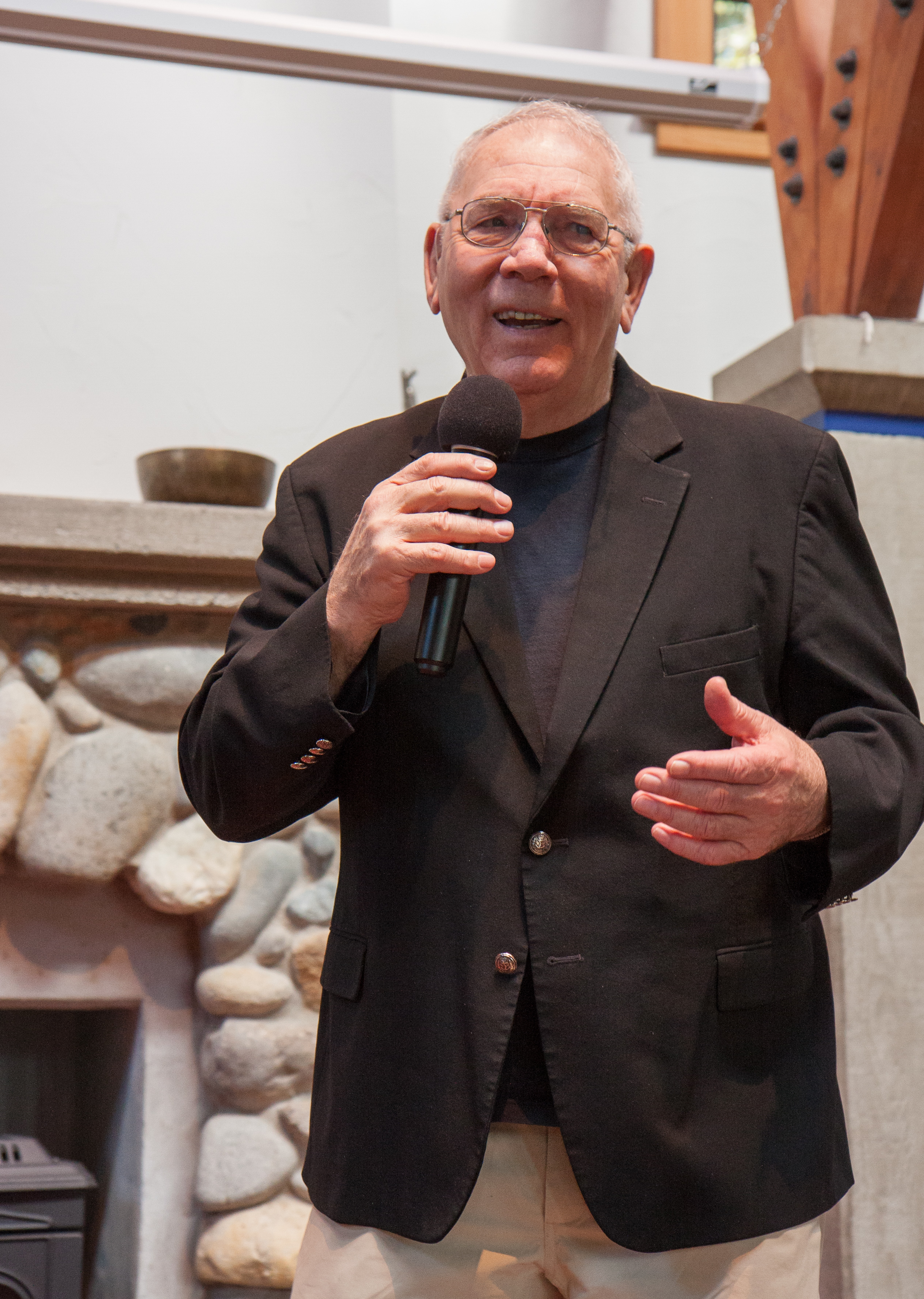
- Lyman speaking at the Intersectional Justice Conference, March 2016
- Born: Howard Fenn Lyman; September 17, 1938; Great Falls, Montana, U.S.
- Died: October 27, 2026 (aged 88); Damariscotta, Maine, U.S.
- Education: Montana State University (B.S. in general agriculture, 1961)
- Occupations: Activist, farmer, writer, lecturer
- Spouse: Willow Jeanne Lyman (née Berg)
- Awards: Peace Abbey Courage of Conscience Award (1997); Vegetarian Hall of Fame, (2002)
- Website: madcowboy.com

Howard Fenn Lyman (September 17, 1938 – October 27, 2026) was an American farmer and animal rights activist known for promoting vegan nutrition and organic farming. In 1997 he was awarded the Peace Abbey Courage of Conscience Award for his leadership in the animal rights movement.

== Early life and career ==
Lyman was born in Great Falls, Montana, on September 17, 1938. He was raised as a fourth generation rancher on a farm that produced dairy and meat commodities. He attended Montana State University and graduated with a B.S. degree in general agriculture in 1961. Upon graduation, he spent two years in the United States Army before returning to work on the farm.

From 1963 to 1983, he was actively engaged in animal and grain production. The areas in which he was involved were dairy, pork, registered Hereford, chicken, range cattle, feedlot beef production, veal, grain, silage, and hay production.

In 1979 Lyman was diagnosed with a tumor in his spine. Faced with the prospect of paralysis, he vowed to return to non-chemical means of farming if he beat the cancer. He survived an operation to remove the tumor and set out to transform his land into an organic farm. He also ran for political office, but lost his first election. He then became a lobbyist, and moved to Washington, D.C.

Circa 1990, again facing health concerns, he became a vegetarian and found his health improved. In 1989 Lyman had begun to investigate Mad Cow disease, which was just becoming an issue in the UK. He eventually became a vegan.

=== The Oprah Winfrey Show appearance ===
In April 1996 Lyman came to national attention during an appearance on The Oprah Winfrey Show. Lyman's remarks on the show led to Winfrey renouncing hamburgers. The National Cattlemen's Beef Association sued Lyman and Winfrey. Both were found not liable in 1998. While the CDC and USDA maintained that Mad Cow Disease could not occur in the US, the government of Japan did not agree.

== Personal life and death ==
Lyman died in Damariscotta, Maine, on October 27, 2026, at the age of 88. He was survived by his wife of 58 years, Willow Jeane Lyman (née Berg).

== Publications ==
Lyman co-authored the book Mad Cowboy (1998) and co-authored No More Bull (2005) and became president of EarthSave. Leaving that post, he became president of "Voice for a Viable Future".

He wrote the foreword to Erik Marcus's book Vegan: The New Ethics of Eating (1998), and the 1st vegan pizza cookbook: Mark Sutton's Heart Healthy Pizza.

Lyman also featured in Franny Armstrong's 2005 documentary McLibel, in Marianne Thieme's 2007 documentary Meat The Truth, and in Kip Andersen and Keegan Kuhn's 2014 documentary Cowspiracy.

He produced four DVDs (A Mad Cowboy Lecture, Earth Talk: 2001, Mad Cowboy: The Documentary, and A Mad Cowboy Lecture: 2007).

== Recognition ==
Lyman was awarded the Peace Abbey Courage of Conscience Award in Sherborn, Massachusetts in 1997 for his leadership in the animal rights movement. His story was featured in Tribe of Heart's 2009 documentary Peaceable Kingdom: The Journey Home. He was also featured on the 2011 documentary Vegucated.

== Honors and awards ==
- 1996: Elected President of the International Vegetarian Union (served through 1999)
- 1997: Peace Abbey Courage of Conscience Award in Sherborn, MA on April 12, 1997
- 2002: Vegetarian Hall of Fame, August 3, 2002, at the North American Vegetarian Society's annual Vegetarian Summerfest in Johnstown, Pennsylvania

== See also ==
- List of animal rights advocates
