= Christspiracy =

2024 documentary about the religion and animal rights

- Directed by: Kip Andersen; Kameron Waters
- Written by: Kip Andersen; Kameron Waters
- Cinematography: Kameron Waters; Kip Andersen
- Edited by: Kameron Waters; Kip Andersen
- Music by: Jon E.K.; Kameron Waters
- Distributed by: A.U.M. Films & Media
- Release date: March 20, 2024
- Running time: 111 minutes
- Country: United States
- Language: English

Christspiracy is a 2024 documentary film produced and directed by Kip Andersen and Kameron Waters. The film starts with the relationship of Jesus Christ and animals — looking for an answer to the question, "How would Jesus kill an animal?" — looking into the connection of Jesus's crucifixion to the animal agriculture industry and diving further into other religions.

The film won the Animal Advocacy Award at the 2025 The International Vegan Film Festival. It has been featured in international news outlets such as Variety, The Guardian, Piers Morgan Uncensored, GBN, and more.

== Synopsis ==
The movie investigates the intersection of theology and animal ethics. While it's called after Christianity, it explores other religions as well, including psychological, sociological, and philosophical sides.

== Production ==
The filmmakers chose to use a crowdfunding campaign after parting ways with Netflix to avoid proposed redactions. The project was launched with a successful Kickstarter campaign, in two weeks over £290,000 GBP were donated by supporters. It also uses a "Pay-It-Forward" model to reach a wider audience than just Netflix subscribers.

== Critical reception ==
Leslie Felperin wrote in Guardian: "The whole movie is like this: a steady feed of assertions about famous dead people with scant textual support mixed with wide-eyed gormless naivety. In an early section Andersen and his co-director Kameron Waters appear genuinely surprised to find that many of the Christian ministers they interview, especially from the Southern Baptist Convention, are actively against vegetarianism. That might have something to do, they timidly suggest, with all the money that flows into churches from the agricultural industry and the likes of Christian companies such as Chick-fil-A and In-N-Out Burger. Likewise, it turns out that killing animals in both kosher and halal fashion doesn’t spare the animal from much suffering. Who knew!".

== Featured individuals ==
The following individuals were featured in the film:

- Andrew Linzey (theologian, priest, activist)
- Melanie Joy (psychologist, author)
- James Tabor (biblical scholar)
- Carol Adams (author, feminist, animal rights advocate)
- Guru Singh (yogi, master spiritual teacher, author)
- Jim Mason (lawyer, journalist and animal rights activist)
- Michael Beckwith (New Thought minister, author)

== See also ==
- Seaspiracy
- Cowspiracy
- Veganism
- Animal sacrifice
- Legal aspects of ritual slaughter
- List of vegan and plant-based media
