= Toni Okamoto =

American plant-based cookbook author

- Education: University of San Francisco
- Occupation: Vegan/Plant-based cookbook author
- Writing career
- Subject: Plant-based cookbooks
- Notable works: Plant-Based on a Budget:Quick and Easy (2023); Plant-Based on a Budget (2019)

Toni Okamoto is an American plant-based/vegan cookbook author and food blogger who appears in the 2017 plant-based diet documentary, What the Health.

== Early life and education ==
Okamoto grew up in Sacramento, California. She was raised by her Mexican grandmother, who taught her how to cook "calabasitas, sopa de fideo and tacos," and her Japanese grandfather, who taught her how to grow food through his farm work after being released from WWII internment camps. After her father came home from the Navy, she lived with him, and they lived on a diet of processed and convenience foods. She states that she first began to alter her diet during high school, when she ran track and her coach suggested that she "cut back on red meats and fast food so that I could perform better," in response to frequent bouts of illness.

When she was in college, she initially joined the vegetarian club in order to get extra credit. She eventually turned to veganism, however, as she was influenced by club members who taught her that it was affordable. She graduated from the University of San Francisco in 2016.

== Career ==
In 2012, Okamoto began posting vegan recipes on her family as a response to the chronic health conditions in her family.

Okamoto is the founder of two blogs focused on accessible plant-based living: Plant-Based on a Budget, a vegan recipes, meal planning guides, and grocery-saving tips blog and Food Sharing Vegan offers easy and inclusive plant-based dishes for home cooks.

In addition to her writing, Okamoto is the co-host of the Plant-Powered People Podcast, where she interviews guests about plant-based eating, sustainability, and personal wellness journeys. She has also partnered with organizations such as the Physicians Committee for Responsible Medicine.

In 2017, she appeared in the plant-based documentary, What the Health.

Okamoto has published four cookbooks. Forbes named her 2019 cookbook, Plant-Based on a Budget, as one of the "Best Vegan Cookbooks" in 2019, and Runner's World listed it as one of the "6 Best Vegan Cookbooks to Get More Plants in Your Diet" in 2022, and was named VegNews’ Cookbook of the Year. It was also a Top 10 finalist in the Goodreads Choice Awards for Best Cookbook that year.

Plant-Based on a Budget: Quick & Easy (2023) was nominated for an IVFF award in 2023, and VegNews listed it as one of the "Top 100 Vegan Cookbooks of All Time" in 2024.

== Personal life ==
Okamoto is married to American animal welfare writer, Paul Shapiro. The two reside in Sacramento, Calif. with their adopted pit bull Eddie.

== Books ==
- Plant-Based on a Budget Quick & Easy: 100 Fast, Healthy, Meal-Prep, Freezer-Friendly, and One-Pot Vegan Recipes. BenBella Books, 2023. ISBN 978-1637742495.
- The Friendly Vegan Cookbook: 100 Essential Recipes to Share with Vegans and Omnivores Alike. BenBella Books, 2020. ISBN 978-1950665365. (With Michelle Cehn)
- Plant-Based on a Budget: Delicious Vegan Recipes for Under $30 a Week, in Less Than 30 Minutes a Meal. BenBella Books, 2019. ISBN 978-1946885982.
- The Super Easy Vegan Slow Cooker Cookbook: 100 Easy, Healthy Recipes That Are Ready When You Are. Rockridge Press, 2017. ISBN 978-1623158958.
