= Paul Shapiro (author) =

American writer and activist

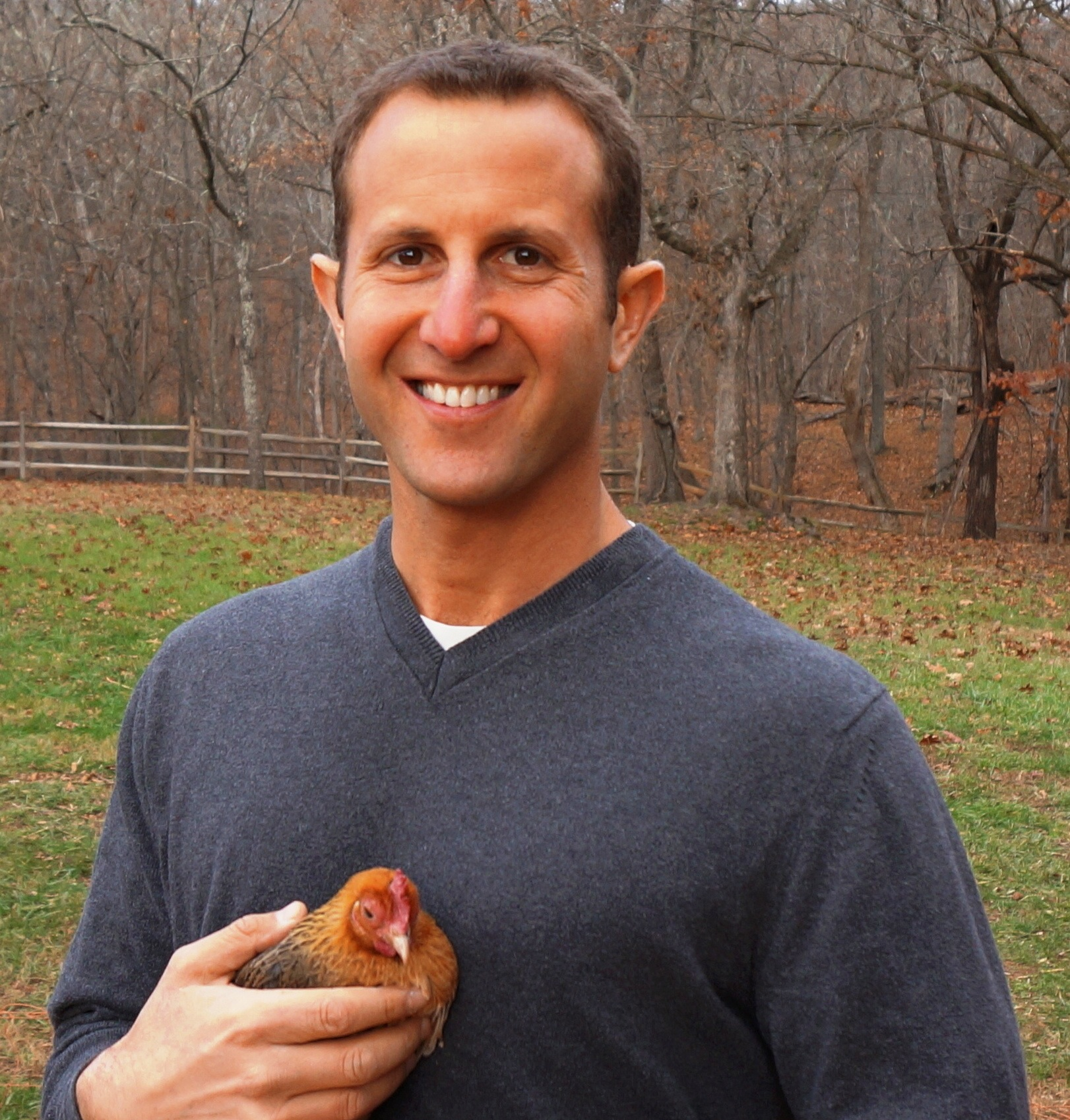
- Born: July 3, 1979 (age 47)
- Education: Bachelor's degree, Peace Studies and Conflict Resolution, George Washington University
- Occupations: Author and activist
- Known for: Founding Animal Outlook (formerly Compassion Over Killing)
- Relatives: Ryan Shapiro (brother)
- Awards: Animal Rights Hall of Fame (2008)
- Website: www.paul-shapiro.com

Paul Shapiro (born July 3, 1979) is an American animal welfare writer who authored the 2018 book Clean Meat: How Growing Meat Without Animals Will Revolutionize Dinner and the World. His novel The Trial of Humanity is scheduled for publication in 2027. He is also the CEO and co-founder of BMC Ingredients (formerly The Better Meat Co.) and the host of the Business for Good Podcast. He has delivered five TEDx talks relating to sustainable food and animal welfare. Prior to publishing Clean Meat, he was known for being an animal protection advocate, both as the founder of Animal Outlook (formerly Compassion Over Killing) and a Vice President at the Humane Society of the United States (HSUS).

== Personal life ==
Shapiro is married to Toni Okamoto, author of The Super Easy Vegan Slow Cooker Cookbook, Plant-Based on a Budget, Plant-Based on a Budget: Quick and Easy, and The Friendly Vegan. The two reside in Sacramento, Calif. with their adopted pit bull Eddie. He is Jewish and attended Hebrew school as a child. He has cited the Talmud's commandment against tza'ar ba'alei chayim ("suffering of living creatures") and other Jewish principles as influences on his animal welfare advocacy.

== Biography ==
Shapiro received a B.A. from George Washington University in 2001, where he majored in peace studies and minored in religion. He taught peace studies at a public high school in Washington, D.C. He was profiled in a 2003 Washington Post Style section article entitled "Animal Pragmatism: Compassion Over Killing Wants to Make the Anti-Meat Message a Little More Palatable".

When he was thirteen years old, Shapiro stopped eating meat as a result of learning about the methods of meat production. About one month later, he stopped eating eggs and dairy.

While a high school student at Georgetown Day School in 1995, Shapiro founded the animal advocacy organization Compassion Over Killing, and served as an undercover investigator and its campaigns director until 2005. Compassion Over Killing became well known for its investigative work exposing conditions for farm animals on factory farms, at livestock auctions, and at slaughter plants.

Shapiro helped spearhead the campaign to end the use of the "Animal Care Certified" logo on egg cartons in the United States. In that case, the egg industry was labeling eggs from hens confined in battery cages as "Animal Care Certified."

From 2005 through 2016, Shapiro led many of HSUS's efforts to protect farm animals, including serving as Vice President of the organization's Farm Animal Protection campaign, including efforts to convince retailers, food service providers, and universities to end their use of eggs from battery-caged birds, pork from gestation-stalled pigs, and to expand their vegan options.

Shapiro co-founded BMC Ingredients. in early 2018 and serves as its CEO. The company's goal is to help meat producers improve sustainability by blending in the start-up's plant-based proteins in their ground meat products.

== BMC Ingredients ==
Shapiro co-founded BMC Ingredients, originally named The Better Meat Co. in 2018 alongside Joanna Bromley and Adam Yee. The company produces mycoprotein ingredients for food manufacturers using a fermentation-based process and has secured multiple patents related to its production methods.

In 2023, Shapiro was recognized as a “Most Admired CEO” by the Sacramento Business Journal. In 2024, the company prevailed in an intellectual property dispute with Meati Foods concerning mycoprotein production technologies. Between 2018 and 2025, the company raised approximately $43 million in venture capital funding.

In 2025, TIME magazine included the company's mycoprotein among its “Inventions of the Year.”

In July 2026, the company changed its name to BMC Ingredients as it shifted its focus to supplying protein ingredients to other food companies. Also in 2026, Rhiza mycoprotein received a bronze Edison Award in the Consumer Food Innovations category.

== The Trial of Humanity ==
The Trial of Humanity is a novel by Shapiro, published by Compass Rose Publishing and scheduled for release in February 2027. It is set after a virus has ended human dominance, when animals hold a tribunal that puts humanity on trial.

== Clean Meat ==
Shapiro's book Clean Meat: How Growing Meat Without Animals Will Revolutionize Dinner and the World, published by Gallery Books in 2018 is the first book to explore the work of start-ups that are growing animal products without the use of animals. It was named as Washington Post bestseller in the week of January 7, 2018. It was widely reviewed.

A copy of Clean Meat is the first book to be bound in lab-grown leather. The book, bound in “clean” leather grown by biotech start-up Geltor.

== Public speaking ==
Shapiro has delivered TEDx talks on topics related to food technology, alternative proteins, and animal welfare. His presentations include:

- Harnessing Fungi to Create a Climate of Change in the Meat World” (TEDx)
- Clean Meat: The Clean Energy of Food (TEDx)
- We Are Better Than How We Treat Animals (TEDx)
- What Will Future Generations Think of Our Treatment of Animals? (TEDx)
- Are We Doing More to Protect Aliens in Space Than Animals on Earth? (TEDx)

== Controversy ==
In September 2016, female employees at HSUS filed a complaint with HSUS human resources representatives over a pattern of inappropriate sexual behaviour they had witnessed over the preceding six years. A month later Shapiro moved to a different department to "advance HSUS' broader agenda." It was reported that Shapiro left HSUS for unrelated reasons in 2018. In a written statement to POLITICO, Shapiro commented, "I’ve taken responsibility for inappropriate behavior years earlier in my career, and apologized to those who may have been offended".

== Selected publications ==
- Moral Agency in Other Animals (2006)
- Defining Agricultural Animal Welfare: Varying Viewpoints and Approaches (with Bernard E. Rollin, Donald M. Broom, David Fraser, Gail C. Golab, Charles Arnot, 2011).
- A Decade of Progress toward Ending the Intensive Confinement of Farm Animals in the United States (with Sara Shields, Andrew Rowan, 2017).
- Clean Meat: How Growing Meat Without Animals Will Revolutionize Dinner and the World (2018)
- The history of Neurospora crassa in fermented foods (2025)
- Beyond Protein: Neurospora crassa as an Underrecognized Dietary Source of Ergothioneine and Spermidine (2026)
- Good inventions, not good intentions: technological displacement of animal use and the drivers of social change (2026)
- The Trial of Humanity (forthcoming, 2027)

== See also ==
- Cultured meat
- Food technology
