= Susan M. Levin =

American dietitian (1971–2022)

- Born: July 21, 1971; Montgomery, Alabama
- Died: July 29, 2022 (aged 51); Washington, D.C.
- Occupation: Dietitian

Susan Marie Levin (July 21, 1971 – July 29, 2022) was an American registered dietitian, advocate of plant-based nutrition and veganism activist. She was one of the authors of the Academy of Nutrition and Dietetics position on vegetarian diets in 2016.

== Biography ==
Levin was born on July 21, 1971, in Montgomery, Alabama. She became a vegan at the age of 24. Levin obtained a Bachelor’s degree in Journalism and Mass Communications from the University of North Carolina at Chapel Hill and a Master of Science in Nutrition from Bastyr University in 2003. She received a specialist certification in sports dietetics from the Academy of Nutrition and Dietetics.

From 2005 Levin was Director of Nutrition Education for the Physicians Committee for Responsible Medicine and did research on the connection between plant-based diets and reduced risk of chronic diseases. Levin criticized the media for promoting animal source foods rich in saturated fat which increases the risk of heart disease. She promoted a high-fiber diet of fruits, legumes, vegetables, grains, nuts and seeds. Levin advised parents to remove dairy products and processed sugar from their children's diets. She was featured in the 2017 documentary film What the Health.

Levin argued against the use of many dietary supplements which she felt were unnecessary. She commented that Vitamin B12 is the only supplement vegans need. Levin stated that there is no reason for people to consume dairy products as a plant-based diet is a healthier option to meet calcium, potassium, and Vitamin D requirements. This has been disputed by other dietitians who have argued that it is very difficult to get the Recommended Dietary Allowance of 1,000 mg of calcium per day on a plant-based diet without dairy products or supplements.

Levin was a speaker at the 2021 Istanbul Vegfest. She died on July 29, 2022, at her home in Washington, D.C. The Physicians Committee for Responsible Medicine created two funds in Levin's honour.

== Selected publications ==
- Vegetarian Diets and Glycemic Control in Diabetes: A Systematic Review and Meta-Analysis (with Neal D. Barnard, Mitsuhiro Watanabe and Yoko Yokoyama, 2014)
- Position of the Academy of Nutrition and Dietetics: Vegetarian Diets (with Winston Craig and Vesanto Melina, 2016)
- Association Between Plant-Based Diets and Plasma Lipids: A Systematic Review and Meta-Analysis (with Neal D. Barnard and Yoko Yokoyama, 2017)
