= Callum Roberts (biologist) =

British marine conservation biologist

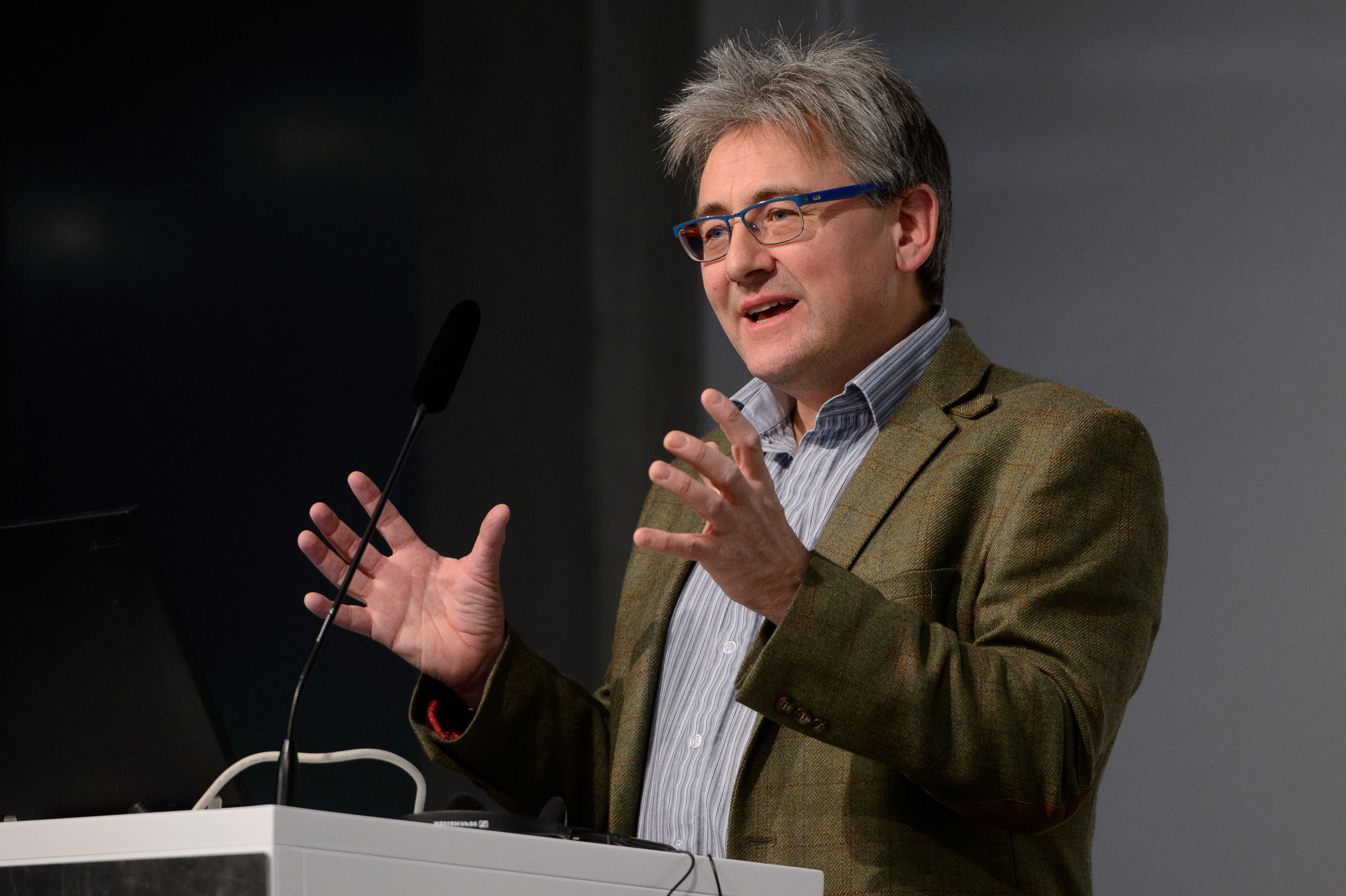
- Education: University of York
- Scientific career
- Workplaces: University of Exeter
- Thesis: Aspects of coral reef fish community structure in the Saudi Arabian Red Sea and on the Great Barrier Reef (1986)
- Academic advisors: Me

Callum Michael Roberts is a British marine conservation biologist, oceanographer, science communicator, author and research scholar at the University of Exeter. He was formerly at the University of York. He is best known for his research and advocacy related to marine reserves and the environmental impact of fishing.

== Career ==
Roberts' work examines the impact of human activity on marine ecosystems, particularly coral reefs. His research output has examined the benefits of marine reserves and no-fishing zones on sustainable fisheries and biodiversity. He began his career studying reefs of the Red Sea in Saudi Arabia, and has also worked in the Maldives and on the Great Barrier Reef.

Roberts is also an active supporter of the Deep Sea Conservation Coalition. He is the Chief Scientific Advisor to Blue Marine Foundation and an Ambassador for World Wide Fund for Nature.

Since 2011 Roberts has written occasional opinion editorials for The Guardian on various marine conservation topics, including overfishing. He has also appeared in the documentary films The End of the Line (2009) and Seaspiracy (2021) and was chief scientific adviser to the BBC's 2017 documentary series Blue Planet II.

He is the author of two award-winning books, The Unnatural History of the Sea (Rachel Carson Award, 2007), which examined the impact of human activity and fishing on marine ecosystems over the last thousand years, and Ocean of Life (Mountbatten Award, 2013), which covers more recent changes in the ocean and proposes reforms to facilitate their recovery. His latest book is Reef Life: An Underwater Memoir (2019).

== Other work ==
1999-2003. Member of editorial board of Conservation Biology, published by the Society for Conservation Biology.

1997-2000. Member of Editorial board of journal Animal Conservation, published by Cambridge University Press.

1996. Senior editor of the proceedings of a symposium: "Marine reserves: Function and Design" held at the 8th International Coral Reef Symposium, Panama.

1991-1996. Co-editor of Reef Encounter, Newsletter of the International Society for Reef Studies.

== Bibliography ==
- The Unnatural History of the Sea. Island Press, 2007. ISBN 9781597261029, 9781597265775
- The Ocean of Life: The Fate of Man and the Sea. Viking Press, 2012; Penguin, 2013. ISBN 9780670023547, 9780143123484
- Reef Life: An Underwater Memoir. Profile Books; Profile Books, 2019. ISBN 9781788162159, 9781788162159
