= PlantPure Nation =

- Directed by: Nelson Campbell
- Written by: Nelson Campbell and Lee Fulkerson
- Produced by: Nelson Campbell
- Starring: T. Colin Campbell; Neal Barnard; Michael Greger
- Distributed by: Evan Saxon Productions
- Release date: 2015
- Running time: 1h 35m
- Country: United States
- Language: English

PlantPure Nation is a 2015 American documentary film that advocates for a whole-food, plant-based diet.

== Synopsis ==
PlantPure Nation features interviews with Dr. Michael Greger, Dr. Neal Barnard, and Professor T. Colin Campbell. It also follows Campbell's son, Nelson Campbell, as he attempts to establish a plant-based health initiative in Mebane, North Carolina, after House Bill 550 failed to pass in the Kentucky House of Representatives. Bill 550 would have established a two-week plant-based pilot nutrition program in Eastern Kentucky. The Bill described the pilot as "a science-based education component" and that it was "a nationally recognized online nutrition education program."

== Reception ==
PETA gave the film a positive review stating, "check to see if it’s coming to a theater near you, rent it, purchase it, and share it. Seriously, it’s a really motivational movie."

== See also ==
- List of vegan and plant-based media
