= They're Trying to Kill Us =

They're Trying To Kill Us
- Directed by: Keegan Kuhn; John Lewis
- Written by: John Lewis; Keegan Kuhn
- Produced by: John Lewis; Keegan Kuhn
- Cinematography: Keegan Kuhn
- Edited by: Marco Jakubowicz
- Music by: The Function
- Production company: Ohh Dip!!! Productions
- Release date: November 11, 2021
- Country: United States
- Language: English

They're Trying To Kill Us is a 2021 American documentary film co-directed and produced by John Lewis and Keegan Kuhn. The film was executive produced by NBA All-star Chris Paul and Billie Eilish. Its story explores racial inequality within the food system and how it directly correlates to the rate at which people of color suffer from disproportionately higher rates of chronic disease. It was released on November 11, 2021.
