= Christina Hicks =

Environmental social scientist

Professor Christina C. Hicks
- Born: 1980 (age 45–46); Kenya
- Occupation: Professor
- Years active: 2013-
- Spouse: Professor Nick Graham
- Children: 3
- Awards: Pew Trusts Marine Fellow, Leverhulme Prize

Academic background
- Education: James Cook University
- Thesis: Ecosystem service values and societal settings for coral reef governance (2013)
- Doctoral advisor: Terry Hughes, Josh Cinner

Academic work
- Discipline: Environmental Social Science
- Sub-discipline: Environmental Economics, human geography, ecosystem services
- Institutions: Lancaster University; Stanford University
- Main interests: Artisanal fishing and livelihoods, seafood nutrition, coral reef fishing communities

Christina Chemtai Hicks is a British Kenyan environmental social scientist who is a Professor in the Political Ecology group at Lancaster University. She is interested in the relationships between individuals, societies and nature. She was awarded the 2019 Philip Leverhulme Prize for Geography.

== Early life, education and career ==
Hicks was raised for most of her childhood in East Africa, and the UK. She earned her undergraduate degree in engineering at Oxford Brookes University, and a Masters at Newcastle University where she studied tropical coast management. She completed her doctoral research at the James Cook University Australian Research Council Centre of Excellence for Coral Reef Studies. After earning her doctorate, Hicks moved briefly to Stanford University, where she joined the Center for Ocean Solutions before moving to a lectureship at Lancaster University in 2015.

== Research contributions ==
Hicks studied the health of global coral reefs. She showed that the coral reefs that have healthy ecosystems were in remote areas with low fishing pressure and locations where there were high levels of local engagement with local marine management. On the other hand, places with poor fisheries governance, intensive capture and a recent history of environmental disaster have worse performing coral reefs.

As global diets move to become more healthy and sustainable, "blue foods" such as fish can have low environmental impacts and are rich in micronutrients. Hicks was interested in the injustices in the production, distribution and consumption of so-called "blue foods". In 2019, Hicks was awarded an ERC Starting Grant to investigate micronutrient variability amongst fish in tropical Africa. She is interested in the impact of fishing pressure, food insecurity and climate changes on these nutrient concentrations, as well as how nutrient concentrations impact social processes. She demonstrated that the nutrients in local fish were more than enough to treat people with malnutrition, but that the catch was often not accessible to people most in need. She has argued that instead of increasing revenue from fish exports, policy is required to ensure that local communities benefit from seafoods. Hicks believes that to effectively combat ecological destruction, efforts must be made to promote a healthy planet and also a just society.

Hicks appeared in the Netflix documentary Seaspiracy, but criticised the film for being misleading.

== Recognition ==
- 2024 Pew Trust Marine Fellow
- 2019 Philip Leverhulme Prize for Geography

== Personal ==
Hick's mother came from a remote village on the mountainous Kenya-Uganda border and had had a career in education for development, and her father is British. Most of her extended family live in Kenya. Hicks is married to the marine ecologist Prof. Nick Graham, also of Lancaster University, and has three sons.

== Selected publications ==
- Ban, Natalie C.; Mills, Morena; Jordan Tam; Hicks, Christina; Sarah Klain; Natalie Stoeckl; Madeleine C Bottrill; Jordan Levine; Robert L Pressey; Terre Satterfield; Kai MA Chan (2013). "A social–ecological approach to conservation planning: embedding social considerations". Frontiers in Ecology and the Environment. 11 (4): 194–202. doi:10.1890/110205. S2CID 86056768. Wikidata Q57049026.
- Joshua E. Cinner; Cindy Huchery; MacNeil, M. Aaron; et al. (2016). "Bright spots among the world's coral reefs". Nature. 535 (7612): 416–419. doi:10.1038/nature18607. PMID 27309809. S2CID 3600223. Wikidata Q39678986.
- McClanahan, Timothy; Hicks, Christina; Darling, Emily (2008). "Malthusian overfishing and efforts to overcome it on Kenyan coral reefs". Ecological Applications. 18 (6): 1516–1529. doi:10.1890/07-0876.1. PMID 18767626. S2CID 17309432. Wikidata Q45776411.
