= Sea of Life =

- Theatrical release poster
- Directed by: Julia Barnes
- Produced by: Julia Barnes
- Starring: Julia Barnes, Rob Stewart, Louie Psihoyos, Madison Stewart, Sylvia Earle, Kip Andersen
- Narrated by: Julia Barnes
- Cinematography: Julia Barnes
- Music by: Jeff Rona
- Production company: Oceanic Productions
- Release date: 2016
- Running time: 88 minutes
- Country: Canada
- Language: English

Sea of Life is a 2016 documentary film written and directed by Julia Barnes. It follows the filmmaker on a worldwide journey as she examines global environmental issues facing the ocean, and documents the movement that's working to protect it.

== Synopsis ==
When she was 16, Barnes watched Rob Stewart's documentary Revolution and learned about the decline of life in the oceans. She felt compelled to take action and created her own documentary, Sea of Life. The film follows her journey as she investigates the causes and solutions to some of the most pressing threats facing the oceans, including the decimation of the world's fish populations and ocean acidification.

Sea of Life begins by examining the importance of the oceans to our very existence. Through compelling footage and interviews, it tells a story of the interconnections of all life on earth, and asserts that the current mass extinction in the oceans will have devastating impacts on terrestrial life, including humans.

Barnes positions the film as a call to action, believing that once more people know what's happening in the ocean, they'll want to fight for its protection. The film also documents many of the largest environmental rallies, including the People's Climate March in New York and protests at COP21 in Paris, but concludes that these actions will not be enough to save our future. Sea of Life calls for a revolution in the way we approach activism.
