= Seaspiracy =

2021 documentary about the environmental effects of fishing

- Official poster
- Directed by: Ali Tabrizi
- Produced by: Kip Andersen
- Cinematography: Ali Tabrizi; Lucy Tabrizi
- Edited by: Ali Tabrizi; Lucy Tabrizi
- Music by: Benjamin Sturley
- Production companies: A.U.M. Films; Disrupt Studios
- Distributed by: Netflix
- Release date: March 24, 2021 (Netflix)
- Running time: 89 minutes
- Languages: English; Thai

Seaspiracy (/siːˈspɪrəsi/) is a 2021 documentary film about the environmental impact of fishing directed by and starring Ali Tabrizi, a British filmmaker. The film examines human impacts on marine life and advocates for ending fish consumption.

The film explores environmental issues affecting oceans, including plastic pollution, ghost nets and overfishing, and argues that commercial fisheries are the main driver of marine ecosystem destruction. The film rejects the concept of sustainable fishing and criticises several marine conservation organisations, including the Earth Island Institute and its dolphin safe label and the sustainable seafood certifications of the Marine Stewardship Council. It also criticises efforts by organisations to reduce household plastic, contrasting their impact with that of ghost nets. It accuses these initiatives of being a cover-up for the environmental impact of fishing and corruption in the fishing industry. Seaspiracy concludes by supporting marine reserves and for ending fish consumption.

The film was produced by Kip Andersen, director of the documentary Cowspiracy, and used the same production team as this previous film. Initial financial support was provided by British entrepreneur Dale Vince, and it was acquired by Netflix in 2020.

The film premiered on Netflix globally in March 2021 and garnered immediate attention in several countries. The film received mixed reviews; reviewers praised it for bringing attention to its subject matter, but it was accused of scientific inaccuracy and was criticised by some ocean experts. Organisations and individuals interviewed or negatively portrayed in the film disputed its assertions and accused the film of misrepresenting them. Seaspiracy also prompted responses from other environmental organisations, academics and seafood industry groups, and several media outlets fact-checked certain statements in the film.

== Synopsis ==
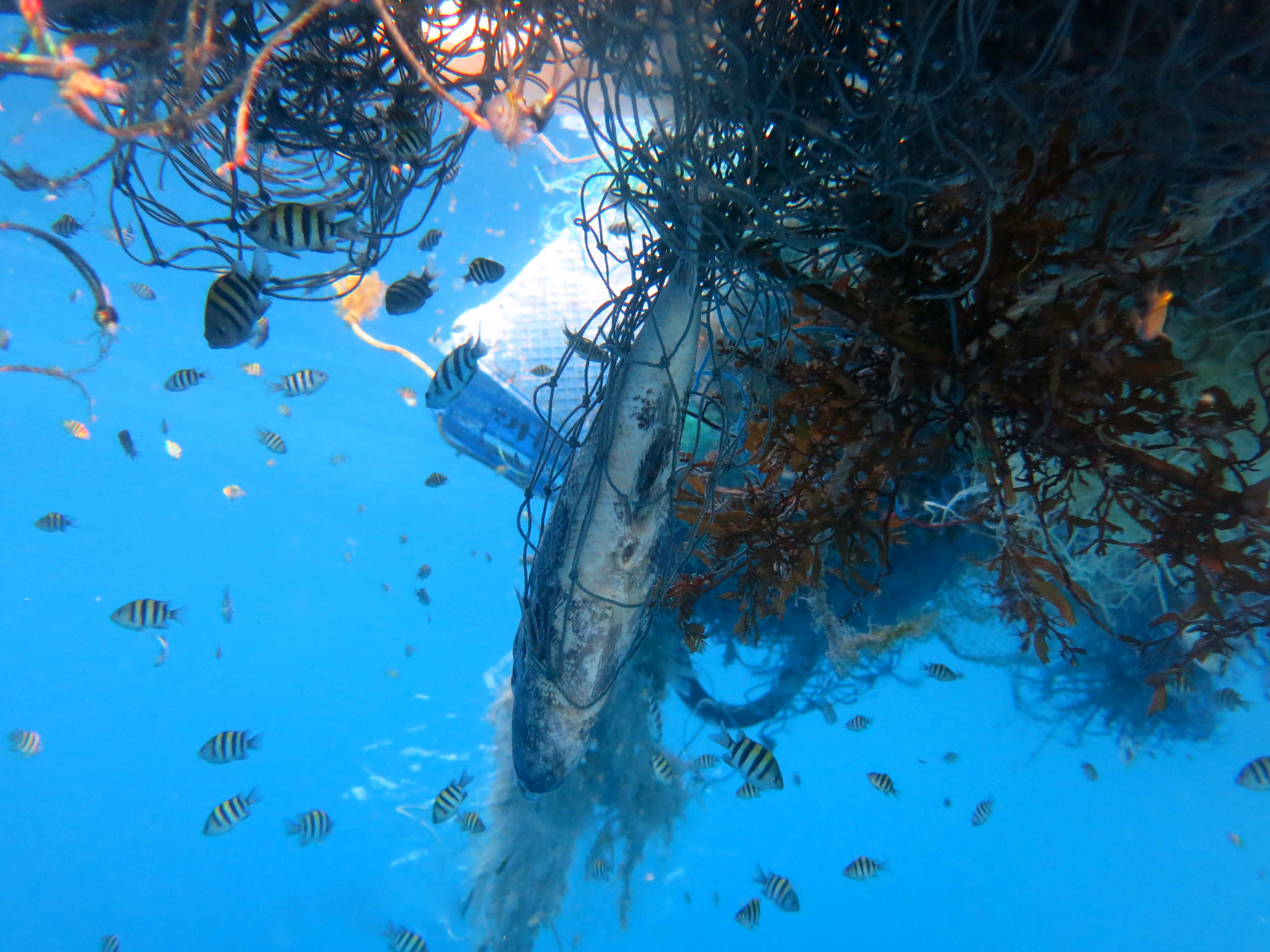
Marine organisms entangled in a ghost net within the Maldives

Tabrizi acts as both the narrator and protagonist of the film, discovering key pieces of information at the same moment as the viewer. This framing device serves to provide narrative momentum and suspense. The film centers early on the collapse of whale, shark, dolphin and sea turtle populations. The film asserts that the focus of environmental groups on comparatively small consumer plastics like straws has obfuscated the larger problem of plastic waste from fishing gear, or ghost nets, as well as the devastation of bycatch. The film also suggests environmental organizations have been unable to define or effectively implement sustainable fishing, sustainable seafood or dolphin-safe products. These criticisms are particularly focused on the Marine Stewardship Council, the Earth Island Institute and the Plastic Pollution Coalition.

The film's settings are global, including the Taiji dolphin drive hunt in southern Japan, whaling in the Faroe Islands, Thai and Chinese fish markets, coastal West Africa, and salmon aquaculture farms in Scotland. At various moments, Tabrizi and his crew appear to face imminent peril from local authorities or corrupt fishing industry players; some of the action is presented through hidden camera techniques, and animation is used to depict scenes of violence. Activities of the Sea Shepherd Conservation Society—an American conservation group focused on direct action at sea—feature prominently in the film, including an extended section documenting illegal fishing practices and worker exploitation in Liberian waters. The film also includes an investigation into modern slavery conditions on Thai fishing vessels, and interviews several survivors.

That the cessation of fish consumption is the solution to collapsing fish stocks and human exploitation remains a consistent message throughout the film. Statistics repeatedly buttress this point, including various fish species listed at >90% wild population loss, and the claim that global oceans could be essentially devoid of fish by 2048. The possibility of fish farming aquaculture is introduced, only to be dismissed after a trip to Scotland. The film suggests that aquaculture is untenable due to the problem of feed for farmed fish and the prevalence of disease and coastal degradation.

== Production and release ==
Seaspiracy received production support and initial funding by British renewable energy entrepreneur Dale Vince after meeting Cowspiracy director Kip Anderson in 2016. The same production team was used as this previous film. Ali Tabrizi had previously directed a film called Vegan in 2018. Seaspiracy was acquired by Netflix in 2020 and released on the platform on March 24, 2021.

== People featured ==
- Ric O'Barry
- Jonathan Balcombe
- Sylvia Earle
- George Monbiot
- Callum Roberts
- Chris Langdon
- Cyrill Gutsch
- Richard Oppenlander
- Paul de Gelder
- Steve Trent of Environmental Justice Foundation
- Lori Marino
- Karmenu Vella (former European Commissioner for Fishing and Maritime Affairs)
- Dominique Barnes (Co-founder of New Wave Foods & Marine Biologist)
- Gary Stokes
- Michael Greger
- from Sea Shepherd Conservation Society:
  - Paul Watson
  - Lamya Essemlali
  - Peter Hammarstedt
  - Tamara Arenovich

== Reception ==
The documentary was one of the top ten most watched films on Netflix in several countries in the week of its release and generated significant traction on social media.

=== Critical response ===
On review aggregator website Rotten Tomatoes, the film holds an approval rating of 75% based on 8 critic reviews, and an average rating of 7.7/10.

Natalia Winkelman of The New York Times gave a mixed-to-negative review, concluding that the film "does present some pieces of reporting — including an inquiry into dolphin-safe tuna can labels — that are surprising and memorable. But even the film's notable points seem to emerge only briefly before sinking beneath the surface, lost in a sea of murky conspiratorial thinking."

Aswathi Pacha also reviewed the film negatively in The Hindu, citing concerns over its scientific veracity and accusations of misrepresentation from participants.

Liz Allen of Forbes was also critical of the film, writing "While perhaps produced with good intentions, Seaspiracy fails to provide a critical lens to the problems it unveils".

John Serba of Decider said, "Seaspiracy isn't the purest form of documentary journalism, but Tabrizi makes his point with enough principled persuasion to make it worth your time," while also questioning its tone, saying "some of the fishing industry's troublesome ethical quandaries occur in the shadows, but to call its corrupt elements conspiratorial is almost pointlessly sensational". The Independent rated it 4 out of 5 stars and called it a "shocking indictment of the commercial fishing industry".

Emma Stefanski of Thrillist said, "If shock and awe are what it takes to get the message across, then Seaspiracy is effective, if not particularly multifaceted."

Common Sense Media gave the film a 4 out of 5 stars and 15+ rating, calling it "tough but necessary viewing" and "backed with evidence from journalists, authors, marine biologists, oceanographers, frontline activists, and industry insiders". It questions the use of director Ali Tabrizi as protagonist to be followed around.

Writing for the American socialist publication Jacobin, Spencer Roberts says that the film "is not without its faults. Its interview style is abrasive. It has excessive animation. It makes a couple of statistical misinterpretations and several oversimplifications. Yet the film is mainly accurate and devastatingly detailed." Addressing the disputes over its scientific accuracy, he says "[i]t's fair to say that Seaspiracy cited some studies that can be considered dated or disputed, but it also left out some of the most harrowing statistics published in recent years", including the bycatch of 8.5 million sea turtles from 1990 to 2008, total fish hauls peaking in 1996, and perhaps 25% of all fishing ships using forced labor.

=== Responses from animal rights groups ===
PETA wrote the movie "is not to be missed" and encouraged readers to host watch parties.

In 2022, the film won PETA's Oscat award for best picture.

=== Responses from environmental groups ===
Greenpeace commended the film for promoting various marine issues, but challenged the conclusion of abstaining from fish consumption, distinguishing between industrial fishing and traditional harvesting. Greenpeace instead suggested alternate solutions. A representative of Fauna and Flora International wrote that the film has "bitterly divided the environmental community" and described its interpretation of scientific studies as "highly problematic and often woefully misleading." Although also questioning its "western-centric and absolutist perspective", it accepted that it was "broadly right on some central issues... with significant caveats".

Charles Clover of Blue Marine Foundation and author of the book The End of the Line criticised the film's scientific accuracy, saying "there are a few jaw-dropping factual errors" such as its framing of whale strandings. He said such strandings have a variety of causes other than plastic pollution alone, and accused Seaspiracy of deriving its narrative from previous documentaries, such as the film adaptation of his book. Nonetheless, he praised its communication of marine fisheries and conservation issues to a new audience, stating "[t]he problem of overfishing is immense, global, remote, horrifying and it is really hard to get people to focus on. Until now, Tabrizi's generation thought banning plastic straws was more important. But it isn't. Overfishing is." Although he found a "lot to admire" in the film's criticisms of the fishing industry and sustainable seafood certification organisations, he called the film's conclusion of not eating fish "thoroughly unsatisfactory".

Environmental journalism outlets Earther (a publication of Gizmodo) and Hakai Magazine both gave negative reviews. They both criticised the film for suggesting that previous media had not covered the facts discussed in the film, and questioned its tone and accuracy. A reviewer in Hakai Magazine wrote, "had Tabrizi looked at any of these issues in greater depth, he'd have found that journalists have been covering these sorts of stories for years and have not glossed over the nuance."

=== Responses from seafood industry groups ===
Internal documents leaked before the film's release authored by the National Fisheries Institute, a trade group representing the US seafood industry, revealed a new media strategy to protect the fishing industry and to characterize the then-unreleased documentary as a "dishonest attack". The National Fisheries Institute appealed to Netflix ahead of the film's release to "distinguish between legitimate documentaries and propaganda", stating "audiences will not recognize the film's true agenda [as] a vegan indoctrination movie".

After the movie was released, a spokesperson for Scottish Salmon Producers Organisation (SSPO) said the film's coverage of Scottish salmon aquaculture was "wrong, misleading and inaccurate". The Global Aquaculture Alliance also criticised the film, saying "reputable NGOs have worked tirelessly with industry over the past 20-plus years to continually improve the lives of the people working in aquaculture and fisheries as well as the ecosystems in which aquaculture and fisheries are practiced", and suggested abandoning fisheries and aquaculture would "abandon the approximately 250 million people employed by the industry and rob billions of people of a healthful source of protein".

=== Responses from academics ===
Bryce Stewart, a University of York marine ecologist and fisheries biologist, criticised the film's scientific accuracy and neutrality, calling it "the worst kind of journalism" and questioning its lack of coverage of the impacts of climate change on oceans. He said that "the biggest error is to say that sustainable fisheries don't exist. This is like saying that sustainable agriculture doesn't exist. All food production systems have an impact on the natural world, but obviously some more than others." He acknowledged "the movie was right to highlight overfishing as the biggest current threat to marine biodiversity. This is widely accepted by scientists and the evidence for this is very strong".

Daniel Pauly, project leader of the Sea Around Us project at the Institute for the Oceans and Fisheries at the University of British Columbia, wrote in Vox that the documentary "make[s] the important point that industrial fishing is... a too often out-of-control, sometimes criminal enterprise that needs to be reined in and regulated." However, he said it also "undermines [its message] with an avalanche of falsehoods", citing its coverage of marine debris, bycatch and sustainable fishing, as well as "blames the ocean conservation community, i.e., the very NGOs trying to fix things, rather than the industrial companies actually causing the problem".

In an article in Nature Ecology and Evolution, Dyhia Belhabib criticised the film's conclusion of ending fish consumption, calling this "embedded in white privilege and colonialism" and "[ignoring] that more than 90% of the global fishing effort is small-scale and coastal in nature". She proposed management solutions and decolonisation of ocean science and advocacy.

=== Responses from those featured ===
The Marine Stewardship Council, Earth Island Institute and Plastic Pollution Coalition disputed their negative portrayal in the documentary, and suggested that their representatives' comments were cherry-picked. Oceana disputed the statement that they receive funding from the seafood industry. Christina Hicks, an academic at Lancaster University and James Cook University who appeared in the film, did not endorse it. She said she committed her career to the fishing industry, in which "there are issues but also progress and fish remain critical to food and nutrition security in many vulnerable geographies". However, The Guardian columnist George Monbiot expressed his support for the film and its message. While acknowledging some inaccuracies, Monbiot says that the main point of the film is correct: the fishing industry is the greatest cause of the ecological destruction of the oceans, and cites the 2019 IPBES report as evidence to back this assertion. The marine conservation biologist Callum Roberts from the University of Exeter also argued against criticism. He said "my colleagues may rue the statistics, but the basic thrust of it is we are doing a huge amount of damage to the ocean and that's true. At some point you run out. Whether it's 2048 or 2079, the question is: 'Is the trajectory in the wrong direction or the right direction?'"

== Scientific accuracy ==
The scientific accuracy of several statements in Seaspiracy has been questioned by several fisheries scientists and marine conservationists. BBC News, Newsweek and Radio Times have each written a fact check article about the film.

=== Fishing nets versus plastic straws as marine debris ===
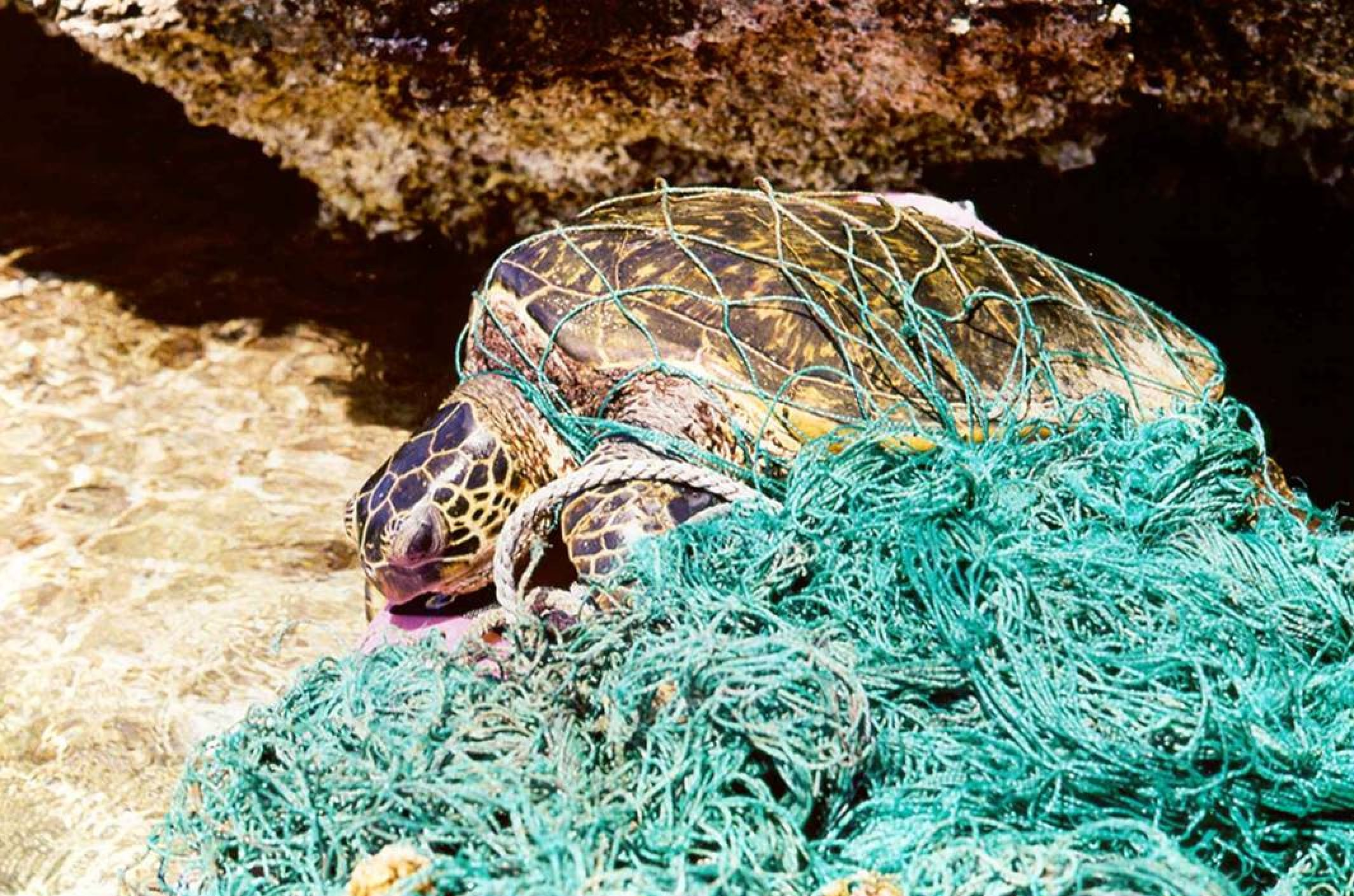
A turtle entangled in a ghost net

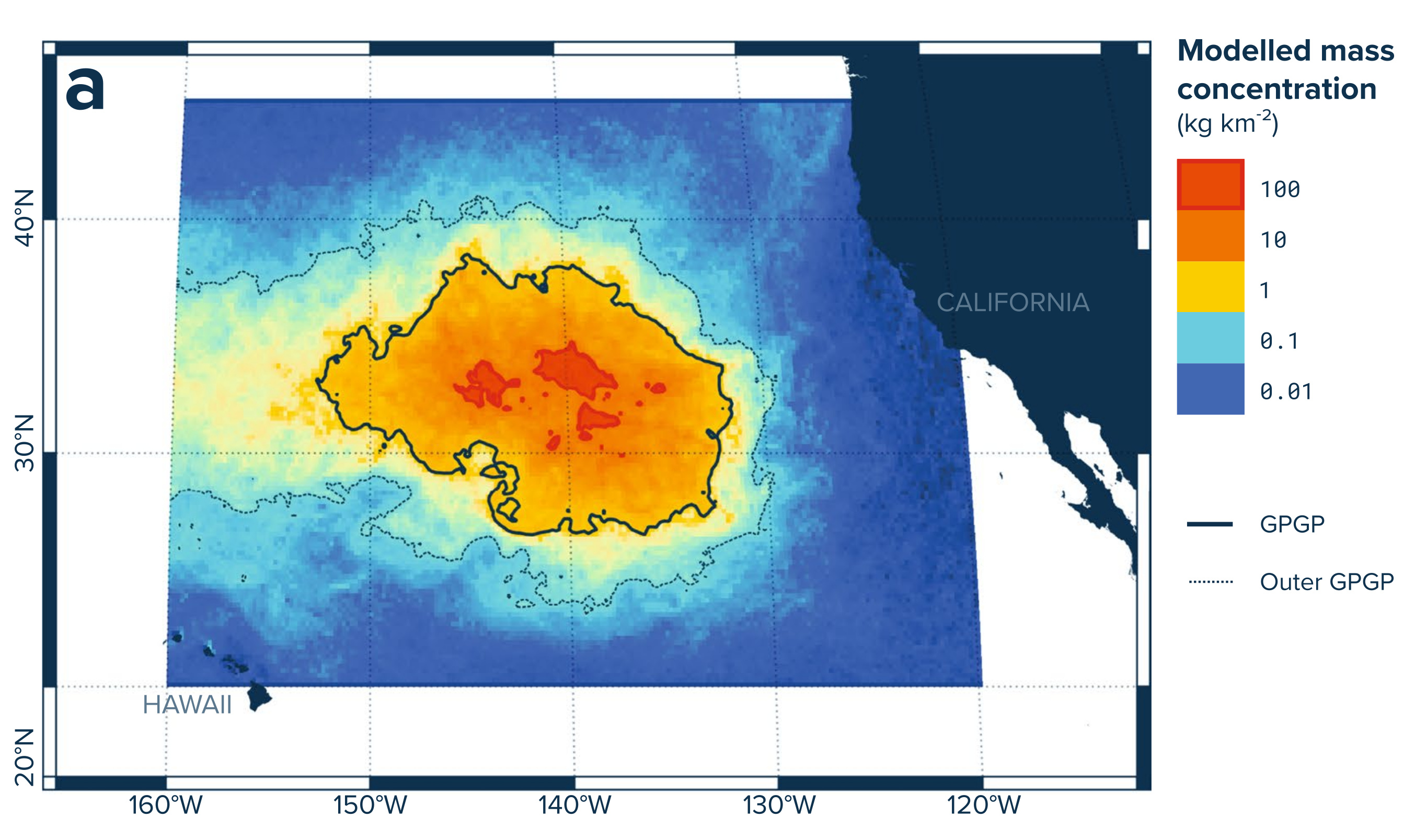
The Great Pacific Garbage Patch in 2017

In Seaspiracy, narrator Tabrizi criticises a public focus on plastic straws, stating that they only account for 0.03% of ocean plastic. He contrasts this with fishing nets, saying they make up 46% of the Great Pacific Garbage Patch. The fishing net statement derives from a 2018 study, which examines floating marine debris by weight. The study found that at least 46% of floating plastic in the Great Pacific Garbage Patch came from fishing nets.

According to the BBC News fact check, the share of plastic straws in ocean plastic (0.03%) seems to be calculated using numbers from two studies. One study is on plastic straws on coastlines, the other on floating marine plastic in the Great Pacific Garbage Patch. The fact check cites Jenna Jambeck, the author of the coastline study, saying "no-one really knows how much of it is straws, but experts agree that it is certainly a lot less than dumped fishing gear." The author of the latter study on the Great Pacific garbage patch, is quoted as saying "[fishing gear] fragments much more slowly and is also very buoyant; prime candidates to hang around in the GPGP", as opposed to thinner plastics like straws and bags, which disintegrate and sink.

An article in Forbes concluded that the film's focus on the Great Pacific Garbage Patch was "misleading", as this region of the ocean accumulates buoyant plastics and therefore "does not provide a particularly accurate depiction of the marine plastic in the entire ocean overall".

=== Empty oceans by 2048 statement ===
The film says that a leading fisheries expert found "that if current fishing trends continue, we will see virtually empty oceans by the year 2048."

This prediction originates from the conclusion section of a 2006 study by a team of marine ecologists led by Dr. Boris Worm published in Science. In the final paragraphs of the study, the authors extrapolated from the percentage of fisheries that have already collapsed and predicted that 32 years later, no more fish would be caught in the ocean. When interviewed for the BBC fact-check article about Seaspiracy in 2021, Worm said, "the 2006 paper is now 15 years old and most of the data in it is almost 20 years old. Since then, we have seen increasing efforts in many regions to rebuild depleted fish populations". The BBC also noted that other experts had taken issue with the original 2006 study.

=== Dolphin-safe tuna labels ===
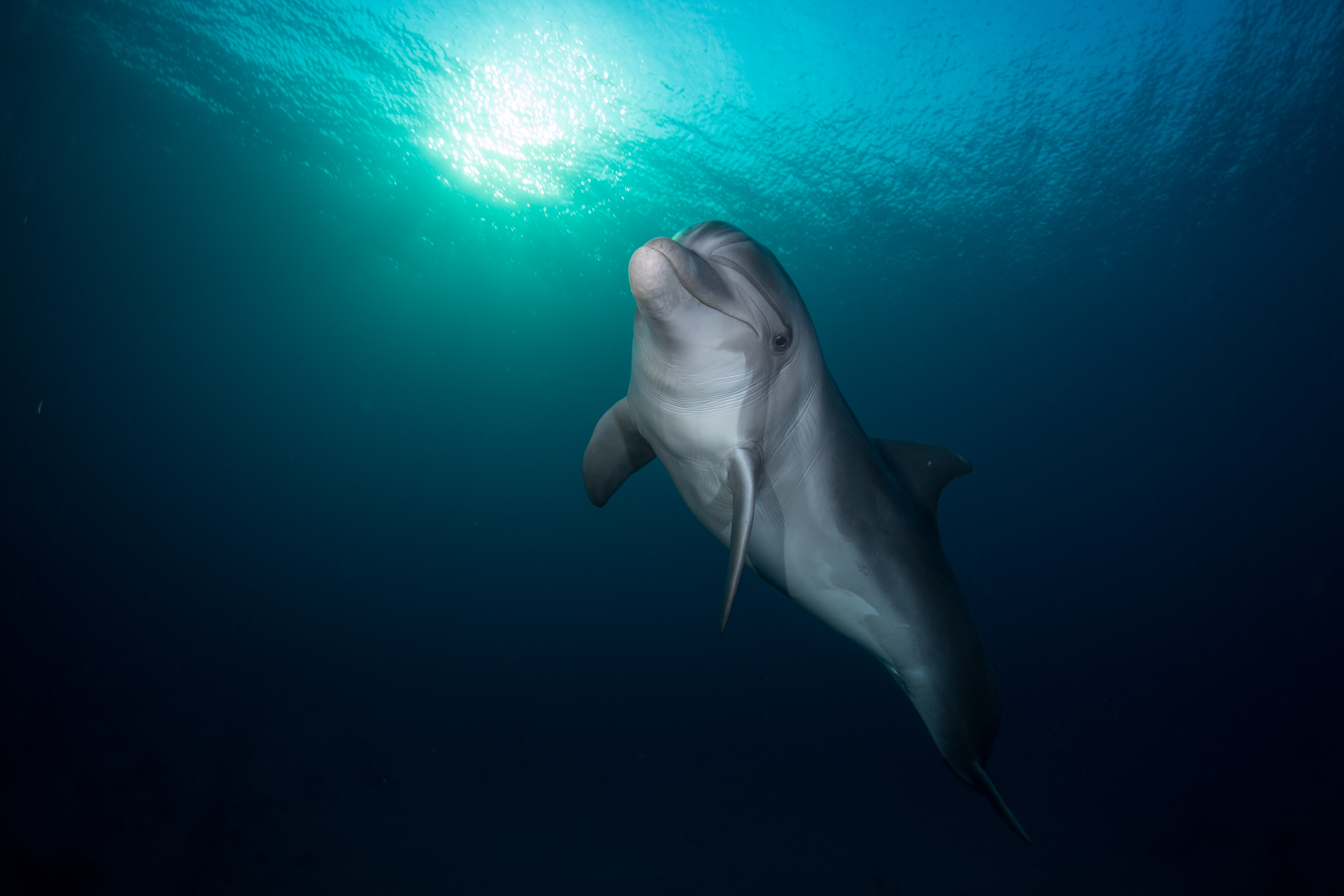
A dolphin underwater

The film criticises dolphin safe labels on tuna and says that "the internationally recognized seafood label was a complete fabrication since it guaranteed nothing". This is in response to Mark Palmer, associate director of the International Marine Mammal Project of the Earth Island Institute, who says on camera that "dolphin safe" tuna cannot be guaranteed, and that observers can be bribed. Palmer has accused the documentary of taking him out of context.

Senior fisheries scientist Sara McDonald of the Monterey Bay Aquarium was quoted by Newsweek in a Seaspiracy fact check article: "The U.S. dolphin-safe program has been very effective. Dolphin mortality in the 1980s was 130,000. In 2018, there were 819 documented deaths." However, a representative of the Natural Resources Defense Council stated that although "the U.S. laws are good if everyone is being honest, that doesn't mean nothing ever gets in. [Law enforcement] can't catch it all." Newsweek's fact-check article concluded that dolphin safe labels cannot guarantee that no dolphins are harmed during fishing.

== See also ==
- Human impact on marine life
- The Cove, a film about dolphin fishing
- The End of the Line, a book and film about overfishing and the effect of climate change on wild fish
- The Outlaw Ocean, a book and upcoming film about crime at sea; also a 7-part podcast
- List of vegan and plant-based media
