= Lamya Essemlali =

French environmental activist

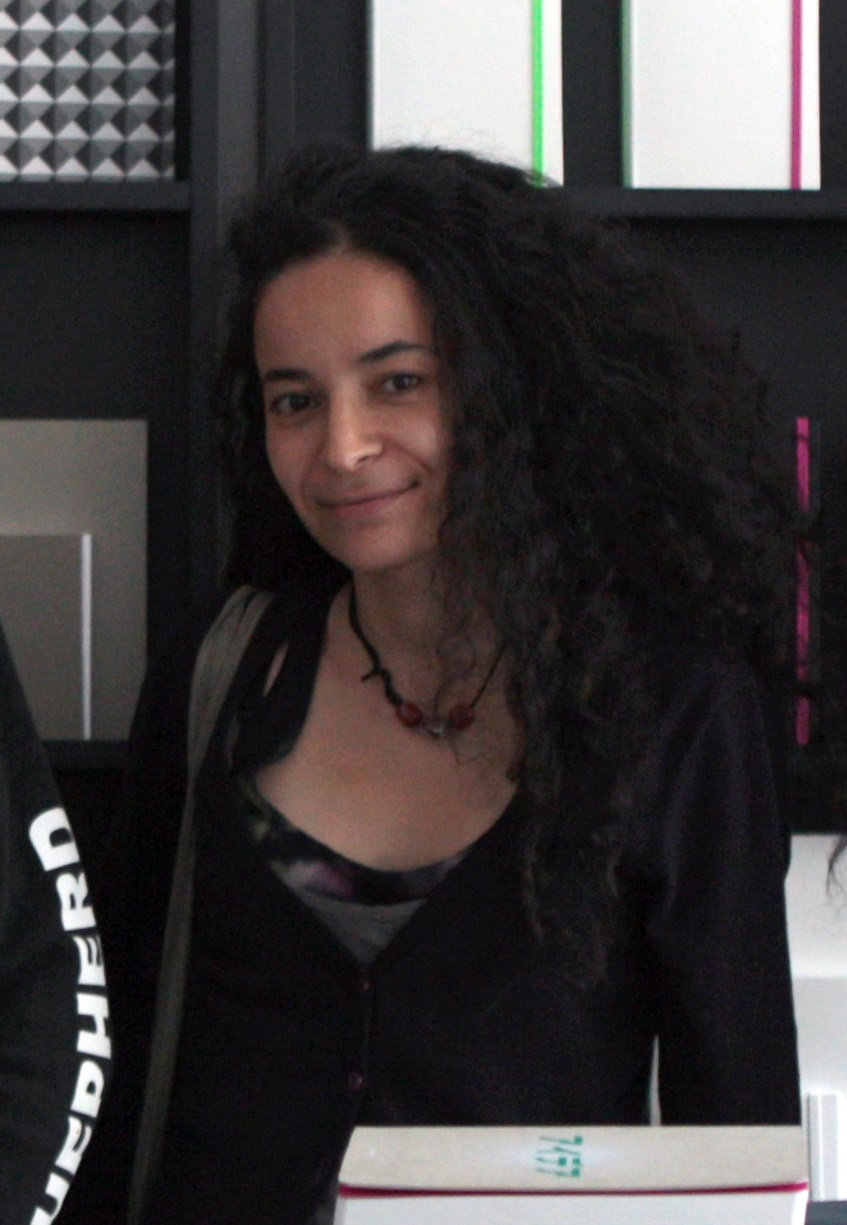
- Essemlali in 2012
- Born: 1979 (age 46–47); Gennevilliers, France
- Occupation: Chairperson of Sea Shepherd France
- Employer: Sea Shepherd Conservation Society
- Website: Sea Shepherd France

Lamya Essemlali (born 1979) is a French environmental activist, of Moroccan origin. She's the co-founder and president of Sea Shepherd France, the French branch of the anti-poaching organisation Sea Shepherd Conservation Society. She is also co-director of Sea Shepherd Global and co-president of the non-governmental organisation Rewild.

== Biography ==
=== Early and personal life ===
Lamya's family is originally from Morocco, but she was born and grew up in Gennevilliers (France), near Paris.

=== Environmental activism ===
Essemlali has a master's degree in environmental sciences and an associate degree in business communications. Prior to her engagement with the Sea Shepherd Conservation Society, she was involved with Greenpeace and the World Wildlife Fund.

Essemlali met Sea Shepherd Conservation Society founder Paul Watson at a conference in Paris in 2005. Her first missions with Sea Shepherd were to Antarctica and the Galápagos Islands. In 2006 she co-founded Sea Shepherd France. She became the president of the organisation in 2008.

Essemlali has led several campaigns for Sea Shepherd Global in the Mediterranean Sea, the Faroe Islands ("GrindStop" campaign) and the Indian Ocean (Réunion Island) to defend bluefin tuna, dolphins, pilot whales, sea cucumbers, and sharks. She has campaigned against dolphin bycatch in the Bay of Biscay and the poaching of Hawksbill sea turtles in Mayotte.

She published the book Captain Paul Watson, interview with a pirate in 2012.

Essemlali is the co-president of the non-governmental organisation Rewild and co-director of Sea Shepherd Global.

== Books ==
- (in French) Capitaine Paul Watson, entretien avec un pirate, by Lamya Essemlali, Paul Watson (2012) ISBN 978-2-7234-8691-0
