= Physicians Committee for Responsible Medicine =

Nonprofit organization

- Founded: 1985
- Founder: Neal D. Barnard
- Purpose: To promote non-animal methods in research and education (opposition to animal testing) and a plant-based diet for disease prevention
- Location: Washington, D.C.
- Members: 150,000
- Employees: 35
- Website: pcrm.org

The Physicians Committee for Responsible Medicine (PCRM) is a non-profit research and advocacy organization based in Washington, D.C. According to Charity Navigator, the organization works for "compassionate and effective medical practice, research, and health promotion."

The Physicians Committee was founded in 1985. The nonprofit currently has nearly one million members, including 17,000 physicians.

== History ==
The Physicians Committee for Responsible Medicine (PCRM) was founded in 1985 by Neal Barnard, a physician and clinical researcher. PCRM currently has nearly one million members, including more than 17,000 physicians.

In the late 1980s and 1990s, PCRM launched public educational programs, including a proposal for the federal government to promote four new plant-based food groups — fruits, grains, vegetables, and legumes — and efforts to challenge the use of animals in experiments and medical training.

The Physicians Committee gained visibility through campaigns addressing nutritional policy and medical ethics, including efforts to eliminate the use of chimpanzees in government-funded experiments.

Its advocacy played a key role in shifting NIH policy to end federally funded experiments on chimpanzees.

== Campaigns ==
=== Atkins Diet ===
The New York Times writes that, in 2004, the PCRM passed Robert Atkins's postmortem medical report to The Wall Street Journal. The report, obtained by Richard Fleming of the Fleming Heart and Health Institute, showed that Atkins himself had experienced a heart attack, congestive heart failure, and weighed 258 pounds when he died. PCRM said that an unknown amount of this weight was due to fluid retention. According to Atkins' supporters, Atkins weighed 195 pounds when he was admitted to the hospital for surgery after falling on the ice, suggesting that he was overweight but not obese. Atkins' supporters countered that there was no reason to suppose that his heart problem (cardiomyopathy) was diet-related, and that the PCRM had received the coroner's report in violation of federal law.

=== Clinical research ===
In 1999, PCRM conducted a diabetes study with Georgetown University that investigated the impact of a low-fat, vegan diet on glycemic and lipid control in patients with type 2 diabetes. In 2000, PCRM conducted a study with Georgetown on the effect of a similar diet for menstrual pain.

In 2003, the National Institutes of Health awarded Barnard a grant for a randomized study on diet and type 2 diabetes. The organization has since published peer-reviewed studies on plant-based diets and their effects on weight loss, liver fat, insulin sensitivity, and menopausal symptoms — demonstrating, for example, that a low-fat vegan diet including soybeans can significantly reduce hot flashes.

PCRM’s Director of Clinical Research is endocrinologist Hana Kahleova, MD, PhD, who trained in Prague and at Loma Linda University before joining PCRM.

== Public health and nutrition education ==
In 2010, PCRM launched its 21-Day Vegan Kickstart, a free program that offers meal plans, recipes, and guidance to try a plant-based diet. The program has since expanded to reach participants in multiple languages and countries.

The Food for Life program trains instructors to deliver nutrition education and cooking classes globally. Campaigns like Let's Beat Breast Cancer, led in partnership with surgeon Kristi Funk, promote the role of diet in cancer prevention.

Since 2013, it has partnered with the George Washington University School of Medicine to host the International Conference on Nutrition in Medicine (ICNM), an accredited medical education event attended by physicians and researchers worldwide.

The PCRM releases an annual report ranking the healthfulness of hospital food. It also encourages hospitals to replace fast food with more healthful options. In January 2016, PCRM placed billboards that read "Eat more chickpeas" near hospitals that host Chick-fil-A locations. In May 2016, it spoke before the board of Grady Memorial Hospital in Atlanta and erected billboards that read "Ask your local hospital to go #FastFoodFree." In June 2016, Grady announced that its McDonald's was shutting down.

The Physicians Committee has received support from several public figures, including Alicia Silverstone, Ellen DeGeneres, Alec Baldwin, Moby, Maggie Q, and Marilu Henner.

=== Action against fast food ===
In 2004, Amy Lanou, the organization's nutrition director in 2004, criticized the U.S. Department of Agriculture for promoting high-fat, high-calorie products, such as certain brands of cookies and fast-food products. Susan M. Levin, the PCRM's director of nutrition education, sent a letter in March 2009 to the minor league baseball team, the West Michigan Whitecaps, to object to a four-pound, 4,800-calorie hamburger on the team's concession-stand menu, and to ask that the team put a label on the burger indicating that it was a "dietary disaster". The PCRM has also spoken out against the Las Vegas restaurant Heart Attack Grill.

The Physicians Committee advertising campaign "I was lovin' it", a spoof of the McDonald's advertising slogan "I'm lovin' it", was used in a September 2010 advertising campaign encouraging consumers to adopt a vegetarian diet to avoid the health risks associated with the high levels of dietary fat, cholesterol, and sodium in McDonald's food. The campaign launched in the Washington, D.C., area showed a grieving woman in a morgue, as the camera circled around a middle-aged man draped in a white sheet and clutching a partially-eaten hamburger. The group highlighted the high levels of fat and sodium in products such as the "Double quarter pounder with cheese extra value meal", which at the time contained 61 grams of fat and 1,650 milligrams of sodium. The group chose Washington, D.C., as the first city for the campaign because it had the second-highest rate of deaths associated with heart disease. McDonald's called the ad "outrageous, misleading and unfair", and encouraged customers "to put such outlandish propaganda in perspective, and to make food and lifestyle choices that are right for them." The National Restaurant Association called such ads misleading, saying that they unnecessarily focus on a single item to "distort the reality that the nation's restaurants are serving an increasing array of healthful menu choices."

== Legislation and policy ==
The Physicians Committee has advocated for legislative change to improve public health. It supported efforts that led to hospital food legislation, requiring plant-based meal options in hospitals, and contributed to reforms in chemical safety laws, including the Frank R. Lautenberg Chemical Safety for the 21st Century Act (TSCA reform), promoting alternatives to animal testing in chemical safety evaluation.

In 2001, the Physicians Committee won a lawsuit against the USDA, with the US District Court ruling that the USDA violated federal law by withholding documents revealing bias among the dietary advisory panel — the council had included individuals representing the National Dairy Council, the National Cattlemen's Beef Association, the American Egg Board, and the National Dairy Promotion and Research Program Board.

In 2011, the organization successfully petitioned the U.S. Department of Agriculture to revise its dietary guidelines, contributing to the development of MyPlate as a replacement for the traditional food pyramid.

=== Chemical testing ===
Since 2007, the PCRM has urged reform of the Toxic Substances Control Act of 1976. On June 22, 2015, President Barack Obama signed into law the Frank R. Lautenberg Chemical Safety for the 21st Century Act, which contains language requiring chemical companies and the Environmental Protection Agency to replace and reduce the use of animal tests and increase the use of human-relevant methods. The Physicians Committee supported the passage of this law.

=== 2015–2020 Dietary Guidelines for Americans ===
When the Dietary Guidelines Advisory Committee (DGAC) announced in February 2015 that "cholesterol is not a nutrient of concern for overconsumption", the PCRM began working to keep cholesterol warnings in the 2015 Dietary Guidelines for Americans. In March 2015, Neal Barnard presented oral testimony at the National Institutes of Health, stating: "for all its good work, the Committee made a scientific error on cholesterol and to carry this glaring mistake into the Guidelines is not scientifically defensible". In October 2015, the PCRM placed billboards reading "#CholesterolKills" near the Texas home offices of Agriculture Committee chairman K. Michael Conaway. In January 2016, the PCRM filed a lawsuit alleging that the DGAC recommended dropping limits on dietary cholesterol, motivated by industry pressure, according to documents recovered by the PCRM under the Freedom of Information Act.

The 2015–2020 Dietary Guidelines for Americans, released in January 2016, set no limit but recommended Americans "eat as little dietary cholesterol as possible" due to "the commonality of food sources of saturated fats and dietary cholesterol". On March 23, 2016, Neal Barnard told The Washington Post that he liked that "the guidelines reinstated the advice to eat as little cholesterol as possible and finally called out a vegetarian eating pattern as one of three healthy options". In 2021, the Committee sued USDA Secretary Tom Vilsack and Secretary of the Department of Health and Human Services Xavier Becerra after the release of the guidelines, alleging the government's nutritional and dietary guidelines intentionally use difficult language to promote eating unhealthy foods. A federal judge in San Francisco dismissed the lawsuit in February 2023.

== Medical education and animal experimentation ==
The Physicians Committee has worked with medical schools internationally to replace animal laboratories in their curricula with better teaching methods.

=== Ending medical school live animal laboratories ===
On June 30, 2016, The Washington Post reported that the University of Tennessee—the last remaining school to use animals—e-mailed the PCRM that "effective immediately, the University of Tennessee College of Medicine Chattanooga has ceased to provide surgical skills training for medical students using live animal models". Over the years, the Physicians Committee demonstrated and placed billboards leading to the decision. The University of Tennessee's announcement followed the decision by the Johns Hopkins University School of Medicine to end live animal use in its surgery-skills training. In 2014, PCRM members demonstrated outside the university. In February 2016, the PCRM worked with Maryland State Delegate Shane Robinson to introduce a bill to end the practice in Maryland. On May 18, 2016, The Baltimore Sun reported that Johns Hopkins University School of Medicine would stop using live animals.

=== Wayne State University dog experiments ===
Since 2011, the PCRM has urged Wayne State University to end its heart failure experiments on dogs. According to a 2015 review article by PCRM doctors in the American Journal of Translational Research: "insights gleaned from decades of animal-based research efforts have not been proportional to research success in terms of deciphering human heart failure and developing effective therapeutics for human patients". In 2015, actor and Wayne State alumna Lily Tomlin joined the PCRM in urging Wayne State to end its dog experiments. In September 2015, the PCRM placed billboards in Detroit that told the story of one of the dogs who died in the experiments.

== Barnard Medical Center ==
In 2016, the Physicians Committee opened the Barnard Medical Center in Washington, D.C., to integrate primary care with nutrition-based treatment.

== Reception ==
PCRM had in the past received donations from animal protection groups, including People for the Ethical Treatment of Animals (PETA). The Foundation to Support Animal Protection (also known as the PETA Foundation) awarded a grant of $432,524 to PCRM in 2000. Neal Barnard had previously served as president of the Foundation.

William T. Jarvis of National Council Against Health Fraud dismissed PCRM as an ideologically driven animal rights organization and a "propaganda machine whose press conferences are charades for disguising its ideology as news events". In 1991, PCRM requested for the United States Department of Agriculture to abandon its scientifically derived food groups model and replace it with a plant-based food group plan. The PCRM received criticism from dietetic and medical organizations for proposing to remove all dairy and meat products from the basic food groups.

In 1991, James S. Todd then vice-president of the American Medical Association commented that "the AMA finds the recommendations of the PCRM irresponsible and potentially dangerous to the health and welfare of Americans". Todd also suggested that the PCRM were "blatantly misleading Americans on a health matter and concealing its true purpose as an animal rights organization". In the same year AMA spokespersons denounced PCRM as a "pseudo-physicians group" as less than 0.5% of their members were physicians. In 2004, the AMA issued a public statement noting that the previous critical comments are no longer current and the "AMA does not have policy specifically addressing vegetarian diets or the inclusion of milk in a diet".

In 2005, Iain Murray a senior fellow of the Competitive Enterprise Institute commented that "PCRM is not a serious medical organization. At best it is a quack organization, pushing a distorted view of medical science in support of an ideology that values animal lives above research that saves human lives". In 2009, Sheldon Rampton stated that "the general public should understand that every position from PCRM stems from its commitment to animal rights".

In 2014, David L. Katz former director of Yale-Griffin Prevention Research Center suggested that the name of PCRM is misleading, claiming "it is not about responsible medical practice. It is entirely and exclusively about promoting vegan eating. A laudable cause to be sure, but I prefer truth in advertising".

By 2015 it was noted by critics that physicians account for less than 10% of PCRM membership.

== See also ==
- Center for Alternatives to Animal Testing
- Clinical trial
- Cruelty-free
- Debates
- Diabetes
- Health advocacy
- Health promotion
- Healthcare reform advocacy groups in the United States
- Humane education
- Metabolism
- Outline of diabetes
- Plant-based diet
- Pragmatic clinical trial
- Preventive healthcare
- Three Rs
- List of animal rights groups
- List of vegetarian and vegan organizations
- Vegan nutrition
