= Cowspiracy =

2014 American documentary film

Cowspiracy: The Sustainability Secret
- Promotional release poster
- Directed by: Kip Andersen; Keegan Kuhn
- Produced by: Kip Andersen; Keegan Kuhn
- Starring: Kip Andersen; Howard Lyman; Richard Oppenlander; Michael Pollan; Michael Klaper; Will Tuttle; Will Potter
- Cinematography: Keegan Kuhn
- Edited by: Kip Andersen; Keegan Kuhn
- Production companies: Appian Way; A.U.M. Films; First Spark Media
- Release date: June 26, 2014 (Los Angeles)
- Running time: 91 minutes
- Country: United States
- Language: English
- Budget: $117,092

Cowspiracy: The Sustainability Secret (also known as simply Cowspiracy) is a 2014 American documentary film produced and directed by Kip Andersen and Keegan Kuhn. The film explores the impacts of animal agriculture on the environment—examining such environmental concerns as climate change, water use, deforestation, and ocean dead zones—and investigates the policies of several environmental organizations on the issue.

The film won the Audience Choice Award at the 2015 South African Eco Film Festival and the Best Foreign Film Award at the 12th annual Festival de films de Portneuf sur l'environnement. Cowspiracy has been criticized for asserting that animal agriculture is the primary source of greenhouse gas emissions and environmental destruction, with one source assessing the impact as being less than is stated in the film.

== Synopsis ==
The documentary was directed by Kip Andersen and Keegan Kuhn, and explores the impact of animal agriculture on the environment, and investigates the policies of environmental organizations on this issue. Environmental organizations investigated in the film include Greenpeace, Sierra Club, Surfrider Foundation, Rainforest Action Network, and Oceana.

== Production ==
The film was crowdfunded on Indiegogo, with 1,449 contributors giving $117,092. This funding was 217% of their goal, and it allowed them to dub the film into Spanish and German and subtitle it into more than 10 other languages, including Chinese and Russian. Screenings are licensed through the distributor, as well as through the now-defunct Tugg Inc. website.

An updated version of the documentary, executive-produced by Leonardo DiCaprio, premiered globally on Netflix on September 15, 2015.

The 2017 documentary What the Health was written, produced, and directed by the same production team (Kip Andersen and Keegan Kuhn) as Cowspiracy.

== Featured individuals ==
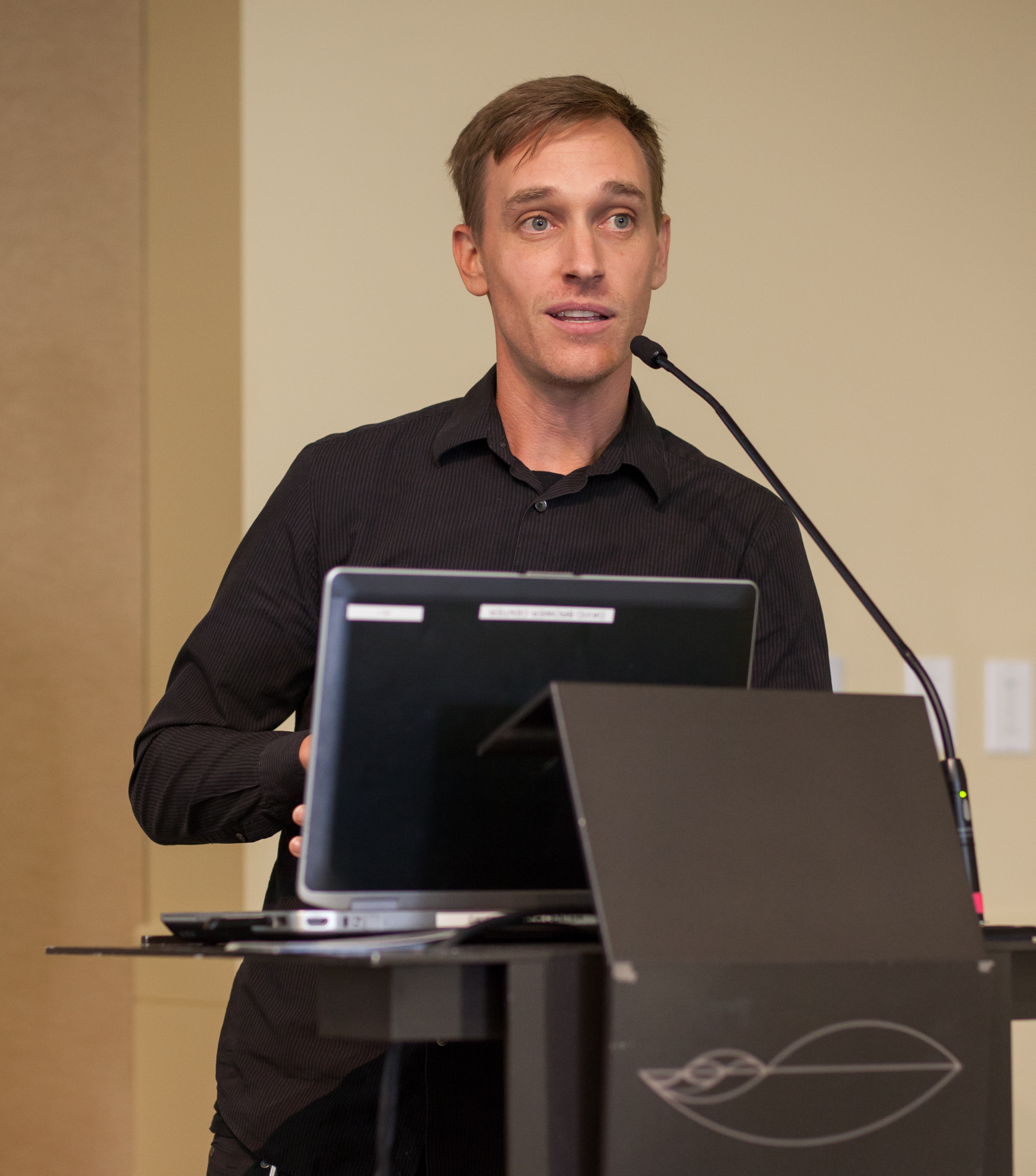
Co-producer/director Keegan Kuhn speaks at the Cowspiracy conference in Berkeley, September 2016.

The following individuals were featured in the film:

- Michael Klaper (physician, author, advisor)
- Howard Lyman (former rancher, author, activist)
- lauren Ornelas (Food Empowerment Project)
- Michael Pollan (author, lecturer)
- William Potter (journalist)
- Kirk R. Smith (environmental health sciences)
- Josh Tetrick (founder of Hampton Creek)
- John Jeavons (biointensive agriculture advocate)

== Reception ==
Cowspiracy won the Audience Choice Award at the 2015 South African Eco Film Festival, as well as the Best Foreign Film Award at the 12th annual Festival de films de Portneuf sur l'environnement. It was also nominated for Cinema Politica's 2015 Audience Choice Award.

=== Criticisms ===
Cowspiracy has been criticized for claiming that animal agriculture is the primary source of greenhouse gases.

Doug Boucher, reviewing the film for the Union of Concerned Scientists blog, disputed the film's assertion that 51% of global greenhouse gases are caused by animal agriculture. He described the 51% figure as being sourced from a 2009 Worldwatch Institute report by Robert Goodland and Jeff Anhang not from a peer-reviewed scientific paper. He claimed to have observed methodological flaws in Goodland and Anhang's logic, and said that the scientific community formed a consensus that global warming is primarily caused by humanity's burning of fossil fuels. He stated that the scientific consensus is that livestock contribute 15% of global greenhouse gas emissions, far lower than the 51% stated by the film and the source article.

== See also ==
- Eating Our Way to Extinction
- Environmental impact of meat production
- List of vegan and plant-based media
- Livestock's Long Shadow
- Intensive animal farming
- Racing Extinction
- Holocene extinction
- The Sixth Extinction
- Seaspiracy
- Veganism
