= Kip Andersen =

American filmmaker, producer and writer

- Born: United States
- Education: California Polytechnic State University-San Luis Obispo
- Occupations: Film director, film producer, screenwriter

Kip Andersen is an American filmmaker, producer, writer, entrepreneur, and the founder of Animals United Movement (A.U.M.) Films and Media, a 501(c)(3) organization which focuses on promoting awareness and equality for all life. He is known for his documentary films such as Cowspiracy: The Sustainability Secret (2014), What the Health (2017), Seaspiracy (2021), and Christspiracy (2024).

== Life and career ==
Andersen graduated from the school of business at California Polytechnic State University, San Luis Obispo. He founded A.U.M. Films, a non-profit focused on creating films and media that promotes thrivability, compassion, and harmony for all life. After Cowspiracy was released, he was invited to speak at European Parliament.

Andersen's interest in the environment began after watching the film An Inconvenient Truth, which caused him to change his lifestyle with the aim of becoming more environmentally ethical. This included incorporating everyday habits such as recycling, conserving power by turning off lights, showering less to save water, and riding a bicycle instead of driving a vehicle. After becoming more involved in the environmental conservation world, Andersen learned of the impacts of animal agriculture on the environment, which led to his interest in creating documentaries that criticize these industries and encourage people to adopt a vegan lifestyle.

In the prologue to the book What the Health, Andersen talks about his family's health history, being conscientious about his own health, and how learning about research into the impact of meat consumption on health influenced him to start the documentary project.

He is also an entrepreneur and certified Jivamukti and Kundalini yoga teacher. Andersen lives in San Francisco.

== Filmography ==
- Cowspiracy: The Sustainability Secret (2014, director, producer, writer, editor)
- What the Health (2017, director, producer, writer, editor, composer, camera operator)
- Seaspiracy (2021, producer, supervising story editor)
- Christspiracy (2024, director, writer)
- Sea of Life (2016, appearance)

== Bibliography ==
- Kuhn, Keegan; Andersen, Kip (2016). Cowspiracy: The Sustainability Secret. Earth Aware Editions. ISBN 978-1-60887-843-7.
- Andersen, Kip; Kuhn, Keegan; Wade-Hak, Harmony; Slawson, Carly (2017). What the Health Cookbook. AUM Films & Media. ISBN 978-0-692-84682-7.
- Andersen, Kip; Kuhn, Keegan; Wong, Eunice (2018). What the Health: The Startling Truth Behind the Foods We Eat, Plus 50 Plant-Rich Recipes to Get You Feeling Your Best. BenBella Books. ISBN 978-1-946885-68-5.

== Awards ==
- 2018 Cinema for Peace Award Nominee, Most Valuable Documentary of the Year, What the Health (2014), shared with Keegan Kuhn
