= Ryan Shapiro =

American researcher

- Born: Ryan Noah Shapiro; 1976 (age 49–50); New York, NY
- Education: Massachusetts Institute of Technology
- Occupation: Doctoral student
- Known for: FOIA researcher, animal rights activist
- Spouse(s): Stephanie Bain (married, 2011-present)
- Relatives: Paul Shapiro (brother)

Ryan Noah Shapiro (born 1976) is a doctoral student at the Massachusetts Institute of Technology Doctoral Program in History, Anthropology, Science, Technology, and Society (HASTS), a U.S. Freedom of Information Act (FOIA) researcher, and an advocate for animal rights.

== Work ==
Shapiro's baccalaureate and graduate studies have dealt extensively with the history of vegetarianism and the animal rights movement. His first publication was an in-depth review of James Gregory's seminal "Of Victorians and Vegetarians: The Vegetarian Movement In Nineteenth-Century Britain". His forthcoming doctoral dissertation is titled "Bodies at War: Animals, The Freedom of Science, and National Security in the United States, 1899-1979" and will focus on the conflict between ethical concerns over animal rights and U.S. national security concerns. In addition to the dissertation, he is also developing a historical map of how the U.S. Federal Bureau of Investigation (FBI) has handled the animal rights movement. Both projects rely on large amounts of information that, while not necessarily classified, is usually only made public once formally requested under the Freedom of Information Act.

When agencies of the U.S. Government have refused to process those requests or provided data that is highly redacted or otherwise manipulated, Shapiro has pursued repeated litigation that has been widely publicized.

Shapiro is regarded by the U.S. Department of Justice (DOJ) as the "most prolific" FOIA requester, and the FBI has claimed that his requests for information through the FOIA are "irreparably damag[ing] to national security."

Politico has called Shapiro “a FOIA guru at the Massachusetts Institute of Technology,” leading open government site Muck Rock has called Shapiro “a FOIA super hero,” and Marsh Professor of Journalism at the University of Michigan, author, and TED Senior Fellow Will Potter has called Shapiro “The FBI's Worst Nightmare.”

== Personal life ==
Ryan Shapiro was born in 1976 in New York City. Ryan is the brother of Paul Shapiro, former vice president of farm animal protection for the Humane Society of the United States.

In 2005, Stephanie Bain answered a want-ad for a roommate posted by Ryan Shapiro. Although initially platonic, Shapiro would eventually propose to Bain at Ellwood Butterfly Preserve and Beach in Santa Barbara, five years after they first met. In 2011, the Shapiro married Stephenie Bain at Brookside Gardens in Wheaton, Maryland. The reception was vegan and was covered in the "Vegan Weddings 2012" section of VegNews Magazine.

Ryan and his wife live in Cambridge, Massachusetts.

== Activism ==
Prior to his FOIA activism and his associated legal efforts, Ryan Shapiro was a leader in the movement to ban foie gras in the State of California. Shapiro, along with colleague Sarahjane Blum, produced the documentary "Delicacy of Despair: Behind the Closed Doors of the Foie Gras Industry" and created a website "Gourmet Cruelty", both of which expressly advocate for a ban on the production and consumption of foie gras. Through the film and website, as well as his support for anti-foie gras activists and protesters whose efforts included exposé-style investigations of companies such as Hudson Valley Foie Gras in New York and Sonoma Foie Gras in California, Shapiro played an important role in generating support for the anti-foie gras movement that led to California successfully but controversially banning the product. (Hudson Valley Foie Gras is largely the subject of "Delicacy of Despair".)

== Litigation ==
Ryan Shapiro's first lawsuit was directly related to his dissertation research. After in-depth study of FOIA regulations, Shapiro was able to determine that processing a request for information that names a specific individual, an investigation of a group that individual is affiliated with and includes a privacy waiver from that individual forces a response when provided to the FBI. Shapiro's technique initially worked and he began processing hundreds of FOIA requests formatted in that manner. After initial success, the FBI eventually refused to provide further information in a timely fashion. FOIA decisions are typically provided within 20 days from receipt of a request. The FBI told Ryan Shapiro that his requests would take seven years to review before he would be told if his request would be rejected. Shapiro decided to sue the FBI and retained the services of Jeffrey Light, a Washington, D.C. appellate attorney with an extensive background in pro bono civil rights and FOIA cases.

In court, the FBI claimed that due to the volume of requests that they were receiving from Shapiro, there was no way for them to effectively redact the content of released records. Because of the sheer number of requests, even heavily redacted records could be assembled to create a "mosaic", a complete view of the FBI's ongoing investigations into animal rights groups.

Alongside other notable animal-rights activists, Ryan Shapiro was a co-plaintiff in the high-profile Federal lawsuit Blum v. Holder. Alexander Reinert of the Benjamin N. Cardozo School of Law and David Milton and Howard Friedman of Howard Friedman PC represented the plaintiffs. The case challenged the constitutionality of the Animal Enterprise Terrorism Act 18 U.S.C. § 43-2006 (also known as the AETA) which criminalizes certain forms of protest and other actions against animal-using enterprises and their employees that the law purports to be "acts of terrorism". Shapiro and the other plaintiffs argued the measures are draconian violations of First Amendment freedom of speech and freedom of the press protections. Department of Justice lawyers representing the defendant Eric Holder argue that because the plaintiffs were never prosecuted under the AETA, they failed to meet the standard of an "aggrieved party" that would grant them standing to bring the suit. The plaintiffs contended that as animal rights activists, their work depended upon their ability to speak freely about issues impacting animal rights, and that fear of prosecution under the AETA chilled their speech and as a result negatively impacted their ability to perform their work. The case was dismissed on March 12, 2013 after the presiding Judge Joseph L. Tauro sided with the defense and confirmed the plaintiffs lacked standing.

Shapiro and the other parties to the suit acquired new representation from the Center for Constitutional Rights and appealed the decision, arguing their cases before Judges Lynch, Thompson and Kayatta. There was widespread support for the plaintiffs. An amicus brief was filed on their behalf by the New York State Bar Association that confirmed the original arguments in the case and also held that the terrorism provisions robbed AETA defendants of their Fifth Amendment rights to due process. The ACLU also filed an amicus brief, arguing that the terms used by the AETA are not properly defined and as a result the law is so vague it cannot be properly enforced. Despite the arguments, on March 7, 2014, the appellate court affirmed the case's original dismissal based on standing. The court's published opinion elaborated that the case brought by Shapiro and his colleagues was "based on speculation that the Government will enforce the Act" and that "such unsubstantiated and speculative fear is not a basis for standing."

Shapiro and investigative journalist Jason Leopold filed a joint lawsuit on July 26, 2013 against the FBI for ignoring their FOIA requests concerning a possible file on Michael Hastings, a Rolling Stone journalist who died in a fiery high-speed automobile crash on June 18, 2013 in Los Angeles, California. As the result of the lawsuit, the FBI publicly released 21 pages of internal documents it had compiled on Hastings on September 21, 2013. The documents are available directly through the FBI's website. None of the documents provided allude to Hastings as the target of an investigation, and the FBI claims that the documents represent all of their records on Hastings.

In addition, Shapiro is the sole plaintiff of a lawsuit seeking for a Federal court to force the Department of Justice to comply with an FOIA request for documentation concerning a Federal Bureau of Investigation threat assessment of an alleged plot to assassinate Occupy Houston protesters. On March 12, 2014, the presiding Judge Rosemary M. Collyer of the U.S. District Court for the District of Columbia has ruled that, while the FBI may have a right to refuse some documents to Shapiro, the justification they have provided to the court is incorrect (in a series of briefs filed between June 16 and June 30, 2013, FBI FOIA chief David Hardy maintained that the documents are exempt from the FOIA because they were compiled for "law enforcement purposes"). As of March 23, 2014 the case remains before the court.

In January 2014, Ryan Shapiro sued the Central Intelligence Agency after they failed to respond to a FOIA request he processed for documents related to Nelson Mandela. The request was processed in order to determine whether the US intelligence community played a role in Mandela's arrest and subsequent imprisonment by pro-Apartheid forces in South Africa. In addition to the CIA, the FBI, the National Security Agency and the Defense Intelligence Agency also received FOIA requests from Shapiro. Every other agency responded to the request, although the NSA refused to admit the existence of any records pertaining to Mandela and the DIA responded without processing the request.

In November 2016, Shapiro and Washington, DC–based FOIA specialist attorney, Jeffery Light, founded the non-profit transparency organization, Property of the People. One project of Property of the People, Operation 45, seeks transparency and accountability from the Trump/Pence administration. As of that month, Shapiro had 12 ongoing FOIA lawsuits against several U.S. government departments and agencies, including the FBI, CIA, IRS, National Security Agency, Defense Intelligence Agency, Department of Justice, Secret Service and Bureau of Alcohol, Tobacco, Firearms and Explosives. He said he is "genuinely worried about the survival of FOIA itself as a tool under President Trump." Shapiro told The Nation in February 2017 that Light and himself were working full-time on the project since the election of President Trump.
