= Neal D. Barnard =

American physician, author, and clinical researcher

Neal Barnard
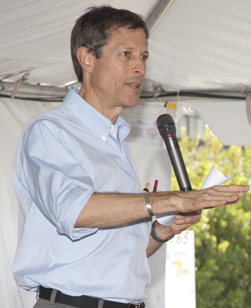
- Barnard in 2014
- Born: 10 July 1953 (age 73); Fargo, North Dakota, U.S.
- Education: Macalester College (BA); George Washington University (MD)
- Occupations: Non-profit executive, author, medical researcher
- Known for: Founding and serving as President of the Physicians Committee for Responsible Medicine
- Website: www.nealbarnard.org

Neal D. Barnard (born 10 July 1953) is an American physician, researcher and animal rights advocate known best as the founding president of the Physicians Committee for Responsible Medicine (PCRM). Barnard has authored books advocating a whole-food, plant-based diet.

== Early life and education ==
Barnard was born and raised in Fargo, North Dakota. He graduated from Macalester College in 1975 with a degree in psychology, then received his medical degree from George Washington University School of Medicine, where he began exploring vegan diets. He is board-certified by the American Board of Psychiatry and Neurology, a fellow of the American College of Cardiology and a lifetime member of the American Medical Association.

In an interview with VegNews, Barnard said that seeing a clogged coronary artery while working in a hospital morgue early in his career influenced his interest in diet and heart disease.

== Career ==
Barnard founded Physicians Committee for Responsible Medicine (PCRM) in 1985 to promote preventive medicine. By 2016, the Washington D.C.–based PCRM had 150,000 members, including 12,000 physicians, and reported revenues of more than $20 million. He appeared in the documentaries Super Size Me (2004), Forks Over Knives (2011), PlantPure Nation (2015), and What the Health (2017). Since 2003, Barnard has served as an adjunct professor of medicine at George Washington University School of Medicine. In January 2016, Barnard founded the Barnard Medical Center in Washington, D.C., which provides primary care with a focus on nutrition guidance.

In 2006, Barnard completed a National Institutes of Health-funded trial to test the impact of diet on blood sugar control in individuals with type 2 diabetes.

In his active practice, Barnard works with patients with diabetes, obesity, and other conditions in clinical research protocols.

In 2011, Barnard was inducted into the Vegetarian Hall of Fame of the North American Vegetarian Society during its summer conference, where he has occasionally spoken.

In February 2013, Barnard's self-help book Power Foods for the Brain: An Effective 3-Step Plan to Protect Your Mind and Strengthen Your Memory was published. Reviewing it, biological psychologist David O Kennedy noted that the book provides a practical guide to lifestyle changes that may benefit general health and brain function for readers with poor diets or prediabetic risk factors. He also cautioned that Barnard's strict vegan approach may be difficult to follow and could raise anxiety about cognitive decline.

By 2019, Barnard had authored 20 books, including The Vegan Starter Kit: Everything You Need to Know about Plant-based Eating.

He has hosted four PBS television programs on nutrition and health.

Suzy Amis Cameron credited Barnard with helping establish vegan meals at Muse, an environmental school in California.

== Diabetes ==
Barnard has led many studies assessing the role of diet in diabetes and other health conditions.

Barnard authored the 2009 book Dr Neal Barnard's Program for Reversing Diabetes. It argues that a low-fat vegan diet can stabilize blood sugar and insulin function and minimize medication within weeks. Jim Mann has commented that although a low-fat vegan diet can help to promote weight loss to manage diabetes "some of the claims made by the author are overrated; in particular, to imply that Type 1 diabetes can be reversed is mischievous".

Elaine Rush stated that although the book does include some sound advice, "not all diabetes can be reversed and therefore the title of this book is misleading." She also suggested that Barnard's low-fat vegan diet would not be suitable for children or pregnant women without expert support. Peter Lipson of Science-Based Medicine has criticized Barnard's views on low-fat vegan diets reversing type 2 diabetes as based on only one study, commenting "This is not a study on which to hang an entire medical philosophy". According to Lipson, weight loss is more important than a specific type of diet in determining diabetes improvement and the idea that a particular diet is a panacea is untrue.

== Selected publications ==
Books

- Barnard, N.D. (2013). Power Foods for the Brain: An Effective 3-Step Plan to Protect Your Mind and Strengthen Your Memory. Grand Central Publishing. ISBN 978-1-4555-1269-0.
- Dr Neal Barnard's Program for Reversing Diabetes (Rodale Press, 2009)
- The Cheese Trap: How Breaking a Surprising Addiction Will Help You Lose Weight, Gain Energy, and Get Healthy (Grand Central Publishing, 2017)
- Your Body in Balance: The New Science of Food, Hormones, and Health (Grand Central Publishing, 2020)

Additional Research

- Dr. Barnard was the Principal Investigator of the Women's Study for the Alleviation of Vasomotor Symptoms (WAVS) study, which compared a dietary intervention versus no intervention for women with menopausal hot flashes. The results were published in the journal Menopause.

== Awards ==
- Lifestyle Medicine Trailblazer Award, 2016 – from the American College of Lifestyle Medicine (ACLM)
- 6th Plantrician Project Luminary Award, 2019 – from the Plantrician Project
- Charles E. Ragus Award, 2023 – from the American Nutrition Association, for 'outstanding research paper published in the Journal of the American Nutrition Association in the past year.'
- Distinguished Service Award, 2018 – from the Medical Society of the District of Columbia
- President's Award, 2026—from MedChi (the Maryland State Medical Society)

== Personal life ==
Barnard plays cello, guitar, and keyboards. He has been a member of the bands Pop Maru, Verdun, and Carbonworks. Alec Baldwin once called Barnard "Eddie Van Halen with a medical degree".

Barnard is an advocate for animal rights. His organization, Physicians Committee for Responsible Medicine, received support from the Foundation to Support Animal Protection and People for the Ethical Treatment of Animals in the 1990s.

== See also ==
- List of animal rights advocates
- List of vegans
