= Keegan Kuhn =

American filmmaker, director, producer, and musician

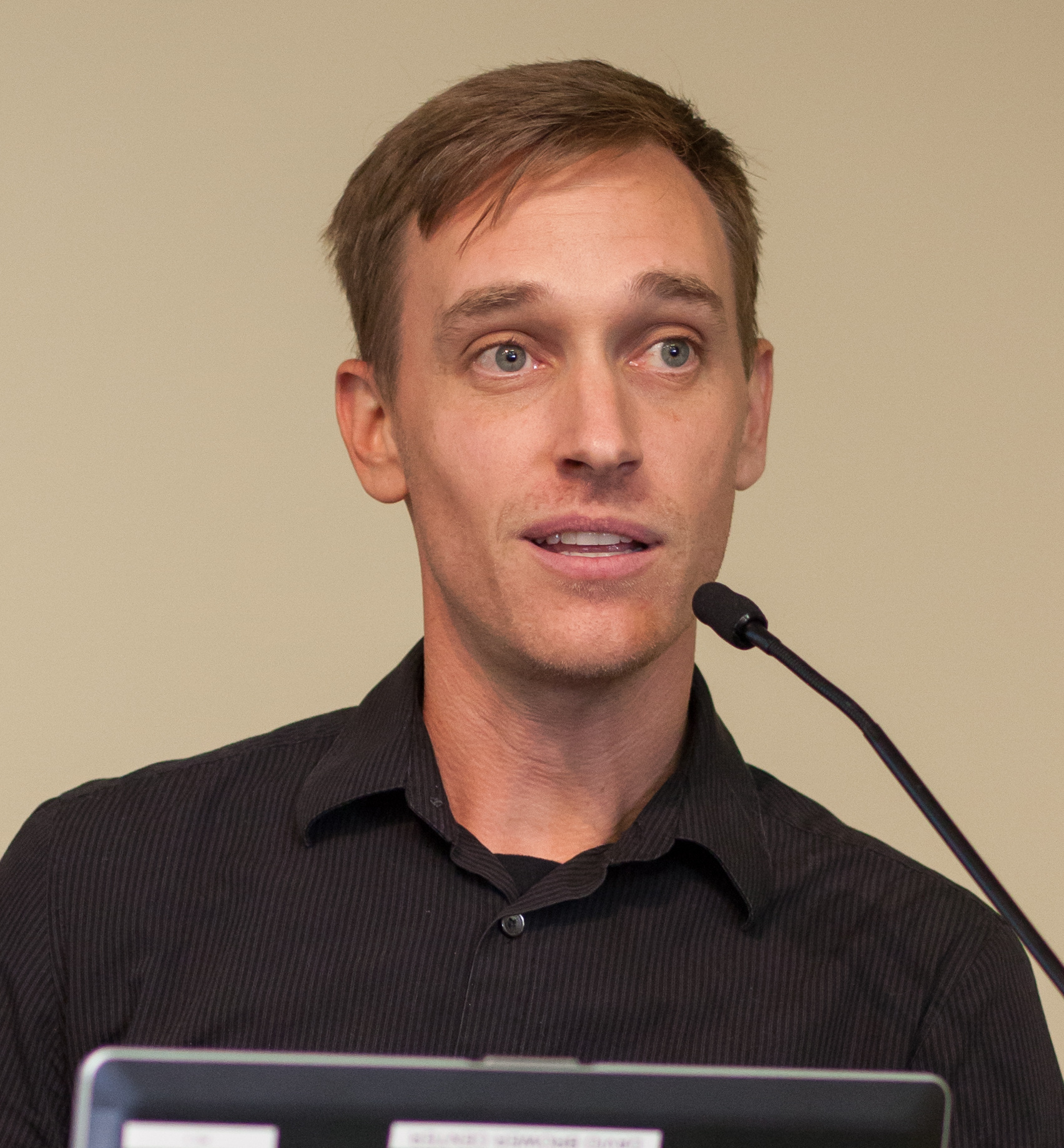
- Kuhn in 2016
- Born: United States
- Occupations: Film director, film producer, musician

Keegan Kuhn is an American documentary filmmaker, director, producer, and professional musician. He is best known for co-directing the documentary films Cowspiracy: The Sustainability Secret (2014) and What the Health (2017), along with Kip Andersen.

== Career ==
Kuhn is the owner of First Spark Media, a digital film production company, which focuses on creating films surrounding social justice issues for companies and non-profits. He also started First Spark Gear, a camera accessory company. In 2018, it was announced that he would be a partner for a project entitled "Fertile Ground: Inspiring Dialogue About Food Access" that received a Bloomberg Philanthropies grant to use art as a medium to help local communities and inform nutrition policy in Jackson, Mississippi.

His work on films have taken him to extreme locations, from the Alaskan wilderness to the American West, where he filmed the remaining feral horses in the United States. In addition to topics like environmental destruction and animal rescue, his work has involved subjects like gender inequality, Buddhism, and endurance sports.

Kuhn is the creator of educational music project True Nature.

== Personal life ==
Kuhn currently resides in the East Bay region of San Francisco with his wife Shani Campbell, a Certified Cat Behaviorist. For most of his life he has been working with nonprofit organizations and assisting in social justice movements. He has been vegan for decades. He spends his day biking and kayaking as much as possible.

== Filmography ==
- Turlock (2013, director)
- Cowspiracy: The Sustainability Secret (2014, director, producer, writer, cinematographer, composer)
- What the Health (2017, director, producer, writer)
- They're Trying To Kill Us (2021, producer)

Kuhn was also interviewed in the 2021 documentary Milked, which was influenced by Cowspiracy. As of August 2020 he is producing a documentary entitled The End of Medicine, which is directed by Alex Lockwood. Rooney Mara and Joaquin Phoenix are involved in the project.

== Bibliography ==
- Kuhn, Keegan; Andersen, Kip (2016). Cowspiracy: The Sustainability Secret. Earth Aware Editions. ISBN 978-1-60887-843-7.
- Andersen, Kip; Kuhn, Keegan; Wade-Hak, Harmony; Slawson, Carly (2017). What the Health Cookbook. AUM Films & Media. ISBN 978-0-692-84682-7.
- Andersen, Kip; Kuhn, Keegan; Wong, Eunice (2018). What the Health: The Startling Truth Behind the Foods We Eat, Plus 50 Plant-Rich Recipes to Get You Feeling Your Best. Dallas, TX: BenBella Books. ISBN 978-1-946885-68-5.

== Awards ==
- 2018 Cinema for Peace Award Nominee, Most Valuable Documentary of the Year, What the Health (2014), shared with Kip Andersen
