= Susan B. Levin =

American philosopher

Susan Levin

Education
- Education: Ph.D., Stanford University; B.A., Pomona College

Philosophical work
- Era: 21st-century philosophy
- Region: Western philosophy
- Institutions: Smith College
- Main interests: bioethics, philosophy of literature, Greek philosophy

Susan B. Levin is an American philosopher and Roe/Straut Professor in the Humanities and Professor of Philosophy at Smith College. She is known for her works on bioethics and ancient Greek philosophy.

== Books ==
- Posthuman Bliss? The Failed Promise of Transhumanism (Oxford University Press, 2021)
- Plato’s Rivalry with Medicine: A Struggle and Its Dissolution (Oxford University Press, 2014)
- The Ancient Quarrel between Philosophy and Poetry Revisited: Plato and the Greek Literary Tradition (Oxford University Press, 2001)
