= Martijn Katan =

Dutch food scientist

Martijn Bernard Katan
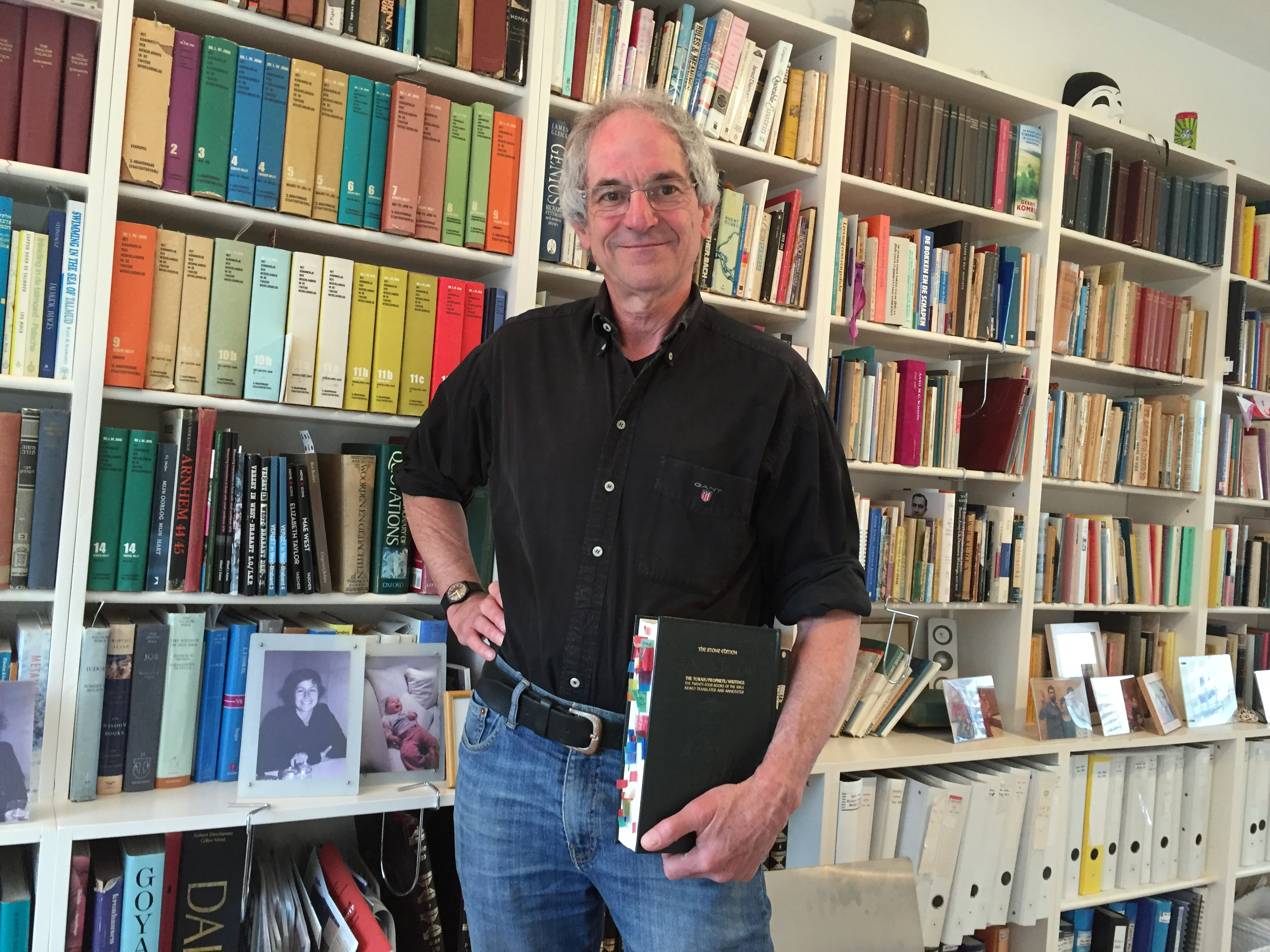
- Born: 1946 (age 79–80)
- Education: PhD in molecular biology
- Alma mater: University of Amsterdam
- Occupations: nutritionist, professor, author
- Known for: An emeritus professor at the Vrije Universiteit Amsterdam and author of two popular science books on nutrition.

Martijn Bernard Katan (born 1946) is a Dutch nutritionist, an emeritus professor at the Vrije Universiteit Amsterdam and author of two popular science books on nutrition.

== Early life ==
Katan was born in Arnhem in 1946.

== Education ==
He studied chemistry and biochemistry at the University of Amsterdam. He obtained his PhD in molecular biology in 1977 under Piet Borst from the same university.

== Career ==
Katan started working at Wageningen University in 1976 where he researched "Nutrition and risk factors for cardiovascular disease". In 1998, he was appointed professor of human nutrition at the university. He was also the "Nutrition Foundation Professor" at the University of Nijmegen from 1985 to 1998. Between 1998 and 2003 he was scientific director of the Nutrition and Health program of the Wageningen Centre for Food Sciences.

In 2003 Katan became a member of the Royal Netherlands Academy of Arts and Sciences. In 2005 he moved from Wageningen University to the Vrije Universiteit Amsterdam where he was appointed professor of nutrition. Katan is a member of the Dutch Health Council.

He took up emeritus status in 2011.

In 2022, he was elected a member of the Academia Europaea.

== Research ==
Katan's research focuses on the relationship between nutrients and their effects on the heart. Katan gained notoriety for his research on cholesterol and trans-fats. He demonstrated, among other things, that boiled coffee creates a cholesterol burden that filtered coffee does not. His research on the harmful effects of trans-fatty acids has encouraged the food industry to minimize the use of trans-fats in the food supply.

== Honors and awards ==
- 2001: The Epstein Award; American Heart Association Council on Epidemiology
- 2003: European Nutrition Award; Federation of European Nutrition Sciences.
- 2004: European Lipid Science Award; European Federation for the Science and Technology of Lipids.
- 2005:, named by the Thomson Society (formerly the Institute for Scientific Information) as a Highly Cited Researcher "in the art of Agricultural Science," which means that he is among the 250 most cited scientists in that field

== Bibliography ==
- What is Healthy?: Myths and Facts About Nutrition (2008). Uitgeverij Bert Bakker. ISBN 978-90-351-3133-0 (Edition 1) & ISBN 978-90-351-3351-8 (Edition 2)
- Voedingsmythes. Over valse hoop en nodeloze vrees. (2016). Uitgeverij Bert Bakker.
