= Nick Cooney =

Investment fund manager

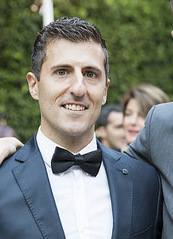
- Education: Hofstra University (Non-Violence Studies)
- Occupation: Managing Partner at Lever VC
- Notable work: How to be Great at Doing Good, Veganomics, Change of Heart
- Website: nickcooney.com

Nick Cooney (born c. 1981) is a managing partner at Lever VC, an investment fund focused on alternative protein companies.

He co-founded the Good Food Institute and was co-founder and Managing Trustee of New Crop Capital. He is the author of three books: Change of Heart (2010), Veganomics (2013), and How To Be Great At Doing Good (2015). He previously worked for the non-profit organizations Mercy for Animals and Farm Sanctuary, and was the founder of the non-profit organization The Humane League.

== Early life and education ==
Nick Cooney was born and raised in Philadelphia, Pennsylvania. Cooney received a bachelor's degree in Non-Violence Studies from Hofstra University in 2003.

== Policy and non-profit work ==
In 2005, Nick Cooney founded The Humane League in Philadelphia, a non-profit organization that works to protect animal welfare. Cooney is one of several people who provided information used in the writing of the book Striking at the Roots: A Practical Guide to Animal Activism (2008) by Mark Hawthorne.

Since then, Nick Cooney's work promoting alternative proteins and animal protection has been featured in media outlets including CNBC, Food Navigator, The Guardian, and the Wall Street Journal. He has also delivered lectures at international conferences and on university campuses such as Harvard and Yale.

Cooney previously worked as campaign coordinator at the non-profit Farm Sanctuary, and as executive vice president at the non-profit Mercy for Animals. He is currently a director with the non-profit Lever Foundation.

=== Mercy for Animals ===
Cooney worked as an executive vice president at Mercy for Animals until 2017.

In 2018, concurrent to the start of #MeToo, some Mercy for Animals staff accused Cooney of harassment and bullying. Cooney, replying to one such accusation post, apologized for the hurt caused by "a very direct way of communicating" along with a defense of himself. Mercy for Animals publicized several institutional changes issued in response to the accusations.

=== The Good Food Institute and New Crop Capital ===
Nick Cooney is former board chairman and co-founder of The Good Food Institute. He is also co-founder and former managing trustee of New Crop Capital, a private venture capital trust that invests in plant-based and cultured meat, dairy, and egg companies. These two organizations collaborate to support the plant-based and cultured food companies.

=== Lever VC ===
Nick Cooney is founder and currently Managing Partner at Lever VC, a U.S.-Asian venture capital fund investing in early stage alternative protein companies.

== Books ==
- Cooney, Nick (2010-09-20). Change of Heart: What Psychology Can Teach Us About Spreading Social Change. Lantern Books. ISBN 9781590562451.
- Cooney, Nick (2013-11-22). Veganomics: The Surprising Science on Vegetarians, from the Breakfast Table to the Bedroom. Lantern Books. ISBN 9781590564288.
- Cooney, Nick (2015-04-27). How To Be Great At Doing Good: Why Results Are What Count and How Smart Charity Can Change the World. John Wiley & Sons. ISBN 9781119041719.
- Cooney, Nick (2025-04-15). What We Don't Do: Inaction in the Face of Suffering and the Drive to Do More. Regalo Press. ISBN 9798888455340.

== See also ==
- Cultured meat
- Animal protectionism

== Interviews ==
- Cooney, Nick (2010-12-10). "Interview Series #18: Nick Cooney". Kiss Me, I'm Vegan! (Interview). Interviewed by Lindsay Wolf. Archived from the original on 2011-08-29.
- Cooney, Nick (2011-03-31). "Interview with Nick Cooney". Vegan Outreach (Interview). Interviewed by Matt Ball. Archived from the original on 2011-05-04.
- Cooney, Nick (2011-08-20). "ARZone interview with Nick Cooney". Animal Rights Zone Transcripts (Interview).
- Cooney, Nick (2020-05-20). "Nick Cooney of Lever VC // investing in alternative protein startups". Upside (Interview). Interviewed by Jay Clouse.
- Cooney, Nick (2019-06-11). "Investor: I wouldn't bet against the plant-based meat space". CNBC Squawk Alley (Interview).
- Cooney, Nick (2020-08-17). ""Covid Adds Yet Another Tailwind - Investor Nick Cooney on Opportunities for Alternative Protein Fund Lever VC". Just Food (Interview). Interviewed by Dean Best.
- Cooney, Nick (2020-08-18). "Lever VC launches new fund targeting alternative protein: deploys first $5m in 10 startups spanning plant-based eggs to cell-cultured breastmilk". Food Navigator (Interview). Interviewed by Elaine Watson.
- "Conversation with Nick Cooney, Executive Vice President of Mercy For Animals". ACE (Interview).

== Other articles ==
- Cooney, Nick (2013-08-06). "Changing Vegan Advocacy from an Art to a Science". Humane Research Council. Archived from the original on 2015-04-16.
- "Nick Cooney and Lever VC Invest In The Good Spoon Foods". Yahoo Finance. 2019-11-01.
- Nick, Cooney (2013-06-06). "Self-interest can make the world a better place—for animals, at least". Quartz.
- "Book Review: Nick Cooney's Change of Heart". Vegan.com. 12 January 2011.
