= You Are What You Eat: A Twin Experiment =

American documentary TV series

- Genre: Documentary series
- Directed by: Louie Psihoyos
- Country of origin: United States
- Original language: English
- No. of episodes: 4

Production
- Running time: 198 minutes
- Production company: Oceanic Preservation Society

Original release
- Network: Netflix
- Release: January 1, 2024

You Are What You Eat: A Twin Experiment is a 2024 American documentary series set for streaming on Netflix. It is based on an 8-week study conducted by Stanford University that put 22 sets of genetically identical twins on opposing (but healthy) diets: omnivore and vegan. It was released on January 1, 2024.

== Background ==
You Are What You Eat: A Twin Experiment is based on an 8-week study conducted by Stanford University that put 22 sets of genetically identical twins on opposing (but healthy) diets: omnivore and vegan. The subjects were given their meals for the first four weeks and had to prepare their own meals during the second 4 weeks. According to the leader of the study, Christopher D. Gardner, the twins on the vegan diet had "a 10% to 15% drop in LDL cholesterol, a 25% drop in insulin, and a 3% drop in body weight in just eight weeks, all by eating real food without animal products." In addition, 21 (out of 22) of the people asked to follow a vegan diet stayed with it for the entire 8 weeks. Gardner argues that examining genetically identical twins in this manner increases the level of accuracy in the data.

Of the 22 sets of twins, the series focused on four pairs. Carolyn (vegan) and Rosalyn (omnivore) participated in the study with the goal of "increasing Filipino representation in scientific studies". After the study, both returned to an omnivorous diet but now include more plant-based meals. Pam (vegan) and Wendy (omnivore) are South African chefs who run a catering company. After the study, they returned to an omnivorous diet but reduced their intake of meat and cheese. John (vegan) and Jevon (omnivore) are nursing students who also like to work out. After the study, they both returned to an omnivorous diet but cut out most red meat from their diet. Michael (omnivore) and Charlie (vegan) own a cheese business and are known as "The Cheese Twins". Prior to the study, Michael was a pescatarian, and Charlie an omnivore. After the study, Michael became a vegetarian, and Charlie now follows a mostly vegetarian diet.

== Response ==
VegNews listed it as one of "The 18 Best Vegan Documentaries to Start Streaming Now " in 2024.

== Episodes ==
No.	Episode	Directed by	Original release date
1	"Episode 1"	Louie Psihoyos	January 1, 2024
2	"Episode 2"	Louie Psihoyos	January 1, 2024
3	"Episode 3"	Louie Psihoyos	January 1, 2024
4	"Episode 4"	Louie Psihoyos	January 1, 2024

== Notable individuals featured ==
- Eric Adams
- Cory Booker
- Christopher D. Gardner
- Michael Greger
- Tracye McQuirter
- Marion Nestle
- Miyoko Schinner
- Tim Spector
- Daniel Humm
- Varun B. Dwaraka

== See also ==
- List of vegan and plant-based media
