= Becky Sandstedt =

American filmmaker and animal welfare activist

- Occupations: Filmmaker, Animal Welfare Activist
- Organization: Farm Sanctuary
- Known for: Investigating conditions of downed animals on commercial farms
- Awards: Animal Humanitarian of the Year (1991)

Becky Sandstedt is an American filmmaker and animal welfare activist. She investigated the conditions of downed animals on commercial farms and is a former investigator for Farm Sanctuary, an American animal protection organization that acts on behalf of farmed animals.

Sandstedt's investigation began after seeing a pamphlet about the treatment of "downers" at livestock markets − animals for sale who were too sick or injured to stand, and who might be left for days with no water, food or treatment. The material prompted her to visit a livestock market belonging to United Stockyards Corporation in South St. Paul, Minnesota. She worked at night as a cocktail waitress and visited the stockyard from October 1989 until May 1991, using a video camera she bought on credit for $75 a month. She requested a meeting with management in 1989 and again in June 1990 through the local humane society, and was told the problem was being dealt with.

In May 1991, she released 44 hours of footage to local and national television stations that showed downed animals lying in pens for days without food or water, cows being dragged by heavy chains attached to a hind leg, pigs kept without food or water in temperatures of −22 °F (−30 °C), and one cow, still alive, frozen to the ground. The footage was reduced to 18 minutes by Farm Sanctuary, and published as "The Down Side of Livestock Marketing".

The story, and a planned protest at the stockyard organized by Farm Sanctuary, received broad coverage in the media, including on NBC's Nightly News and Tom Brokaw's television program "Expose." United Stockyards responded, just before NBC's segment regarding Sandstedt's independent investigation aired on May 19, by announcing a "no downer" policy at South St. Paul and the six other livestock markets the company owned; farmers would no longer be paid for downed animals, but instead the animals would be euthanized and the farmer charged a rendering fee. The company said Sandstedt had not influenced their decision, but had only determined the timing of their announcement. Farm Sanctuary later hired Sandstedt as an investigator. In 1991, she received the Animal Humanitarian of the Year award from the Animal Protection Institute.
