= How not to die =

How Not to Die may refer to:

- How Not to Die: Surprising Lessons on Living Longer, Safer, and Healthier from America’s Favorite Medical Examiner, a 2008 book by Jan Garavaglia
- How Not to Die: Discover the Foods Scientifically Proven to Prevent and Reverse Disease, a 2015 book by Michael Greger
