= Faunalytics =

U.S. animal advocacy research organization

- Formation: 2000
- Founder: Che Green
- Type: Nonprofit
- Legal status: 501(c)(3) organization
- Purpose: Research and analysis of animal issues
- Location: Olympia, Washington, United States
- Executive Director: Brooke Haggerty
- Content Director: Karol Orzechowski
- Communications Manager: Jenna Riedi
- Website: faunalytics.org
- Formerly called: Humane Research Council (until 2015)

Faunalytics is a nonprofit organization that provides animal advocates with access to the research and analysis of various animal issues. Its research areas include factory farming, veganism and vegetarianism, companion animals, animal testing, hunting, animal trapping, wild animal suffering, and the use of animals for entertainment purposes (zoos, circuses, racing, fights, etc.). Faunalytics was founded in 2000 by Che Green, and operated under the name Humane Research Council until 2015. In a book about animal activists in the US and France, Elizabeth Cherry cites the use of Faunalytics studies as part of activists' move towards practical research.

== History ==
Faunalytics is a non-profit organization based in Olympia, Washington, funded through grants and donations. Founded by Che Green, a former analyst and research manager, Faunalytics utilizes contributions of time and expertise from committed professionals in research, marketing, and communications, as well as business service providers and designers for print and online media.

Faunalytics has the GuideStar Platinum Seal of Transparency,

== Research ==
Faunalytics has conducted or contributed to a number of research studies such as a study of public perception of the animal protection movement (National Council for Animal Protection, 2006), the Humane Index (The Humane Society of the United States, 2007), and an independent study on advocating meat reduction and vegetarianism to U.S. adults (2007).

Faunalytics original research
Date	Title
2008–2019	Animal Tracker Survey
2014	Study Of Current And Former Veg*ns
2018	How Does Video Outreach Impact Pork Consumption?
2018	Naturalness Concerns And Clean Meat Acceptance
2018	Attitudes Toward Farmed Animals In BRIC Countries
2018	Pork Or Pig? Beef Or Cow? Implications For Advocacy And Research
2019	Plant-Based Labeling Study
2019	Who Supports Animal Causes?
2019	Who Are The Vegetarians?
2019	Impact of Corporate Commitments on Consumer Attitudes
2019	Donating To One Vs. Millions
2020	The Rise Of Veg, The Fall Of Meat: A Restaurant Case Study
2020	"Reduce" Or "Go Veg?" Effects On Meal Choice
2020	COVID-19 And Animals
2020	The State of Animal Advocacy In The U.S. & Canada
2020	Animal Product Impact Scales
2020	Farm Sanctuary Tours & Dietary Change
2020	U.S. Beliefs About Chickens And Fish
2021	Twitter Trends: #CageFree, #Vegan, #AnimalRights, and More
2021	COVID-19 & Animals: Chinese Citizens' Beliefs About COVID-19's Links With Animal Agriculture
2021	Going Vegan or Vegetarian: Many Paths to One Goal
2021	Growing A Community: How To Support Farmed Animal Protection In China
2021	Going Vegan Or Vegetarian: Motivations and Influences
2022	Attitudes Towards Chickens & Fishes: A Study Of Brazil, Canada, China, & India
2022	Planting Seeds: The Impact Of Diet & Different Animal Advocacy Tactics
2022	Going Vegan Or Vegetarian: Barriers And Strategies On The Path To Success
2022	Chinese Consumers' Attitudes Toward Animal Welfare: Behaviors, Beliefs, And Responses To Messaging
2022	Chinese Consumers' Attitudes Toward Animal Welfare: Behaviors, Beliefs, And Responses To Messaging
2022	Local Action For Animals As A Stepping Stone To State Protections
2023	The Animal Agriculture Industry's Perspective On Advocates & Cage-Free Reforms
2023	Reforming Animal Agriculture Subsidies: A Guide for Advocates
2023	Bringing Back Former Vegans And Vegetarians: An Obstacle Analysis
2023	Different Strokes For Different Folks: Comparing U.S. Groups' Openness to Pro-Animal Actions
2023	Support For Farmed Animal Welfare Legislation In Ten Key U.S. States
2023	Animal Agriculture Is The Missing Piece In Climate Change Media Coverage
2023	Jurors' Reflections On The Smithfield Piglet Rescue Trial
2023	Domination And Exploitation: Understanding Industry Costs For Chicken, Egg, And Fish Products In The United States, Brazil, And China
2024	Research And Data As Tools In Advocates' Decision-Making
2024	Joining Forces: Collaborative Opportunities Between The Animal Protection And Environmental Movements
2024	Global Animal Slaughter Statistics & Charts
2024	Pathways To Impact: An International Study Of Advocates' Strategies And Needs
2024	Creating A More Equitable Movement: Compensation In The Farmed Animal Advocacy Sector
2024	Bridging U.S. Conservative Values And Animal Protection
2024	The Role Of Humanewashing In Grocery Stores: How Welfare Labels Affect Purchasing Behavior
2024	Research And Data As Tools In Advocates' Decision-Making: A Focus On China & Southeast Asia
2024	What Vegan Advocates Can Learn From The Social Spread Of Quitting Smoking
2025	Exploring The Impacts Of Food System Education: A Case Study
2025	Exploring Gen Z's Attitudes Towards Animals And The Environment
2025	The Economic Impacts Of A Plant-Based Transition: Exploring Two Growth Scenarios
2025	Effective Communication With Political Staffers: A Framework For Animal Advocates
2025	How To Message Plant-Based Diets And Products In Southeast Asia: A Social Media Analysis
2025	Cross-Movement Collaboration For Farmed Animal Advocates In Southeast Asia
2025	From Performative To Transformative: Navigating Equity & Inclusion Across A Diverse Animal Advocacy Movement
2025	Quantifying The Small Body Problem: A Meta-Analysis Of Animal Product Reduction Interventions
2025	Political Animals? How U.S. Voters Respond To Candidates Making Farmed Animal Policy Proposals
2025	Public Acceptability Of Standard U.S. Animal Agriculture Practices
2025	Globalizing The Factory Farm: International Organizations And The Spread Of Industrial Animal Agriculture

Faunalytics also maintains a research library with over 6,000 summaries of external research studies on animal related issues. They also produce a series called "Faunalytics Fundamentals", a collection of animal protection topic overviews illustrated using infographics and graphs, and other interactive visual resources for animal advocates.

== Animal Charity Evaluators review ==
Animal Charity Evaluators (ACE) named Faunalytics as one of its Standout Charities in since its 2015 annual charity recommendations. ACE designates as Standout Charities those organizations which they do not feel are as strong as their Top Charities, but which excel in at least one way and are exceptionally strong compared to animal charities in general. ACE reviews organizations designated as a Standout Charity every other year.

In its December 2019 review of Faunalytics, ACE cites Faunalytics' strengths as its focus on an important field (creating and promoting research) and its publication of important research on topics related to effective animal advocacy. Their review states that Faunalytics' research projects are highly transparent, publicly available, and seem to be the result of an impact-focused project prioritization process. According to ACE, their weakness is that the effects of their programs on animals are indirect and difficult to measure.

ACE named Faunalytics as one of three of its Top Charities in 2021. The ACE review highlights the value of research as an important contribution to farmed animal protection, and Faunalytics' impact and effectiveness.

In 2023, ACE decided to move to only one tier: Recommended Charities. Faunalytics was again named a Recommended Charity in 2023. As of 2025, Faunalytics is not listed as a Recommended Charity.

== See also ==
- The Humane League
- Mercy for Animals
- List of animal rights groups
