= Michael Greger =

American physician, author, and speaker on public health

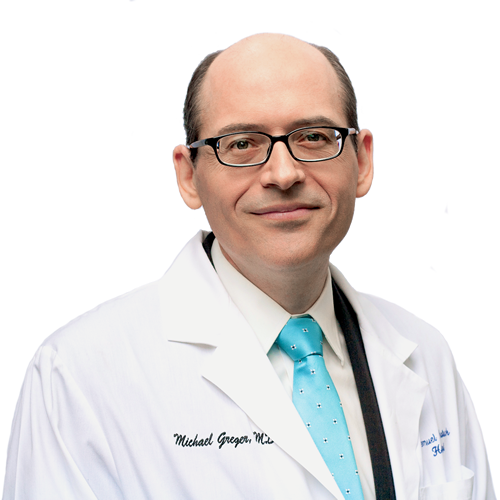
- Born: October 25, 1972 (age 53); Miami, Florida, United States
- Education: Cornell University (BA); Tufts University (MD)
- Medical career
- Profession: General practitioner
- Field: Clinical nutrition
- Website: DrGreger.org

Michael Herschel Greger (born October 25, 1972) is an American physician, author, and speaker on public health issues best known for his advocacy of a whole-food, plant-based diet, and his opposition to animal-derived food products. He founded the website NutritionFacts.org which provides videos and studies around diet and nutrition. His books How Not to Die, How Not to Diet, and How Not to Age have been New York Times best sellers .

== Early life and education ==
Michael Greger was born on October 25, 1972, in Miami, Florida, United States. Greger has said that he was inspired to pursue a career in medicine at the age of nine after witnessing his grandmother's health improvement that she attributed to following dietary and lifestyle changes prescribed by American nutritionist Nathan Pritikin. He later graduated from the Cornell University School of Agriculture in 1995, where as a junior he wrote informally about the dangers of bovine spongiform encephalopathy on a website he published in 1994. In the same year, he was hired to work on mad cow issues for Farm Sanctuary, near Cornell, and became a vegan after touring a stockyard as part of his work with Farm Sanctuary.

In 1998, Greger appeared as an expert witness testifying about bovine spongiform encephalopathy when cattle producers unsuccessfully sued Oprah Winfrey for libel over statements she had made about the safety of meat in 1996. He later enrolled at Tufts University School of Medicine, originally for its MD/PhD program, but then withdrew from the dual-degree program to pursue only the medical degree. He received his MD in 1999 as a general practitioner specializing in clinical nutrition.

== Career ==
In 2001, Greger joined the Organic Consumers Association to work on mad cow issues, on which he spoke widely as cases of the disease appeared in the US and Canada. Previously in 1994, in a Cornell University animal rights publication, Greger highlighted the results of a survey in Britain that appeared to support the view of a microbiologist at the University of Leeds that mad cow disease was "much more serious than AIDS". A decade later, in early 2004, the Daily Bruin, the student newspaper of the University of California, Los Angeles, reported that Greger had called mad cow disease the "plague of the 21st century". However, Greger later denied ever making such a statement, clarifying that he had merely posed it as a question during a speech. That same year, Greger cited a study and said that "thousands of Americans may already be dying because of Mad Cow disease every year".

In 2004, he launched a website and published a book critical of the Atkins Diet and other low-carbohydrate diets. That same year, the American College of Lifestyle Medicine was founded, and Greger was a founding member, and fellow.

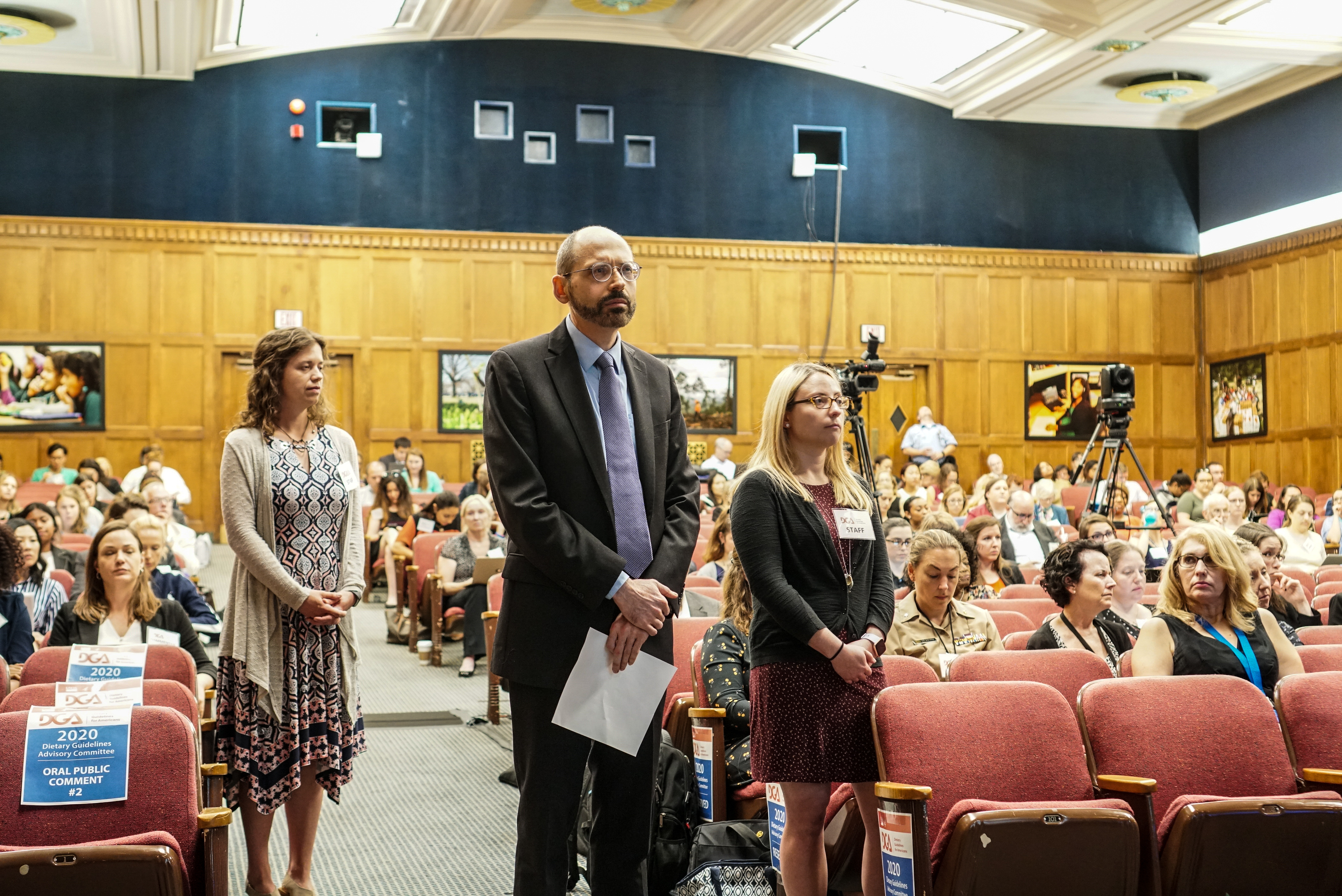
Greger (center) at the USDA Dietary Guidelines Advisory Committee, Washington, D.C., 2019.

In 2005, Michael Greger joined the farm animal welfare division of the Humane Society of the United States as director of public health and animal agriculture. Three years later, he testified before the United States Congress after the Humane Society released its undercover video of the Westland Meat Packing Company, which revealed downer animals entering the meat supply. This led the USDA to mandate the recall of 143 million pounds of beef, some of which had been routed into the nation's school lunch program.

=== NutritionFacts ===
Greger founded the website NutritionFacts.org, with funding from the Jesse & Julie Rasch Foundation. It was founded in 2011 to provide information on nutrition and health. Jesse & Julie Rasch Foundation provided the initial seed funding. Greger, then known for public-health lectures and his work with the Humane Society of the United States, aimed to "cut through the hype" by summarizing findings from peer-reviewed studies in an accessible format. From its inception, the site released a new video every weekday, drawing on Greger's Latest in Clinical Nutrition lecture series, to make complex research digestible for the general public.

NutritionFacts.org follows a nonprofit public-service model with operating costs covered by individual donations and philanthropic grants. Its core service is its video library: referenced videos, most narrated by Greger, which summarizes recent nutrition studies. Each video is accompanied by a transcript and citation list, which helps readers to trace the original research.

In 2017, Greger received the ACLM Trailblazer Award in lifestyle medicine, with NutritionFacts.org cited as a model of freely available, evidence-based education. In 2024, Greger stated that the four things that he would recommend to increase longevity are to live a diet focused around plants, use a treadmill desk, exercise daily, and eat calories earlier in the day. In 2025, its podcast Nutrition Facts with Dr. Greger was voted "Best Podcast" in the VegNews Veggie Awards.

Eric Adams, then Borough President of Brooklyn and later Mayor of New York City, cited Greger's research as a catalyst for adopting a plant-based diet to reverse his type 2 diabetes. Greger also serves in the U.S. News & World Report expert panel that ranks the "Best Diets".

=== Reception ===
Greger's books have appeared on The New York Times Best Seller list multiple times, including How Not to Die three times, and How Not to Diet, and How Not to Age once each.

Greger's third book, Bird Flu: A Virus of Our Own Hatching, received a favorable review which said it was "interesting and informative to both scientists and lay persons". Public health expert David Sencer was critical of the book, writing that it "focuses heavily on doomsday scenarios and offers little in terms of practical advice to the public" and that "a professional audience would quickly put [the book] aside for more factually correct sources of information".

In 2024, Morgan Pfiffner of Red Pen Reviews gave his sixth book, How Not to Diet a score of 50% for its scientific accuracy and a score of 75% for its healthfulness. Pfiffner commented that "While much of the book is well supported by research, there are a significant number of fairly questionable claims, leading to a handful of dietary recommendations that seem unnecessary, too restrictive, or potentially counterproductive". He also argues that Greger's claim that a whole food plant-based diet can reverse heart disease is questionable. According to Pfiffner this has not been demonstrated as the randomized controlled trial that he cited from Dean Ornish did not show regression of atherosclerotic plaque.

Harriet Hall argues that, while it is well-accepted that it is more healthy to eat a plant-based diet than a typical Western diet, Greger often overstates the known benefits of such a diet as well as the harm caused by eating animal products (for example, in a talk, he claimed that a single meal rich in animal products can "cripple" one's arteries), and he sometimes does not discuss evidence that contradicts his strong claims. Joseph A. Schwarcz of McGill University argues that although Greger takes his information from respected science journals and produces impressive videos, he has a vegan agenda and cherry picks his data. He adds, "Of course that doesn't mean the cherries he picks are rotten; they're fine."

Jonathan Jarry in a 2026 article "Dr. Michael Greger’s Bias Is Food for Thought" commented that "while some of the information he puts forward is backed up by good scientific evidence, he regularly demonizes synthetic compounds, exaggerates the danger posed by eating or handling meat, and is uncritical of inadequate studies alleging all sorts of benefits for plant-based compounds".

== Publications ==
Greger advocates for a general move away from a Western pattern diet to a whole-food, plant-based diet. He has been critical of the USDA, stating that "a conflict of interest right in their mission statement" protects the economic interests of food producers in lieu of clear dietary guidelines.

- — (1999). Heart Failure: Diary of a Third Year Medical Student. Jamaica Plain: Michael Greger. ISBN 978-0-9678288-0-0. OCLC 43053157. Archived from the original on October 31, 2022.
- — (2005). Carbophobia: The Scary Truth Behind America's Low Carb Craze. New York: Lantern Books. ISBN 978-1-59056-086-0. LCCN 2004025929. OCLC 56904087.
- — (2006). Bird Flu: A Virus of Our Own Hatching. New York: Lantern Books. ISBN 978-1-59056-098-3. LCCN 2006027971. OCLC 71146431. S2CID 166607854.
- — (2015). How Not to Die: Discover the Foods Scientifically Proven to Prevent and Reverse Disease. New York: Flatiron Books. ISBN 978-1-250-06611-4. LCCN 2015038194. OCLC 927104174. (with Gene Stone)
- — (2017). The How Not to Die Cookbook: 100+ Recipes to Help Prevent and Reverse Disease. New York: Flatiron Books. ISBN 978-1-250-12776-1. LCCN 2017032267. OCLC 967855191. (with Gene Stone & Robin Robertson)
- — (2019). How Not to Diet: The Groundbreaking Science of Healthy, Permanent Weight Loss. New York: Flatiron Books. ISBN 978-1-250-19922-5. LCCN 2019043987. OCLC 1126076423.
- — (2020). How to Survive a Pandemic. New York: Flatiron Books. ISBN 978-1-250-79323-2. OCLC 1183789862.
- — (2020). The How Not to Diet Cookbook: 100+ Recipes for Healthy, Permanent Weight Loss. New York: Flatiron Books. ISBN 978-1-250-19925-6. LCCN 2020032573. OCLC 1132236547.
- — (2023). How Not to Age: The Scientific Approach to Getting Healthier as You Get Older. New York: Flatiron Books. ISBN 978-1-250-79633-2. LCCN 2023026352. OCLC 1334089378.
- — (2024). OZEMPIC: Risks, Benefits, and Natural Alternatives to GLP-1 Weight-Loss Drugs. Takoma Park, Maryland: NutritionFacts.org. ISBN 979-8991660501. LCCN 2024920656. OCLC 1468504996.
- — (2025). The How Not to Age Cookbook: 100+ Recipes for Getting Healthier and Living Longer. New York: Flatiron Books. ISBN 978-1-250-79636-3. LCCN 2024030922. OCLC 1429657918.
- — (2025). Lower LDL Cholesterol Naturally with Food: Simple Ways to Add Proven LDL Reducers to Your Everyday Routine. Takoma Park, Maryland: NutritionFacts.org. ISBN 979-8-9916605-5-6. OCLC 1547390134. (with Kristine Dennis)
- — (2026). Ultra-Processed Foods: Concerns, Controversies, and Exceptions. Takoma Park, Maryland: NutritionFacts.org. ISBN 979-8-9916605-2-5. OCLC 1570205888.

== Bibliography ==
- Deven, Mandy Van (2010). Puskar-Pasewicz, Margaret (ed.). Cultural Encyclopedia of Vegetarianism. Santa Barbara, California: Greenwood Publishing Group. ISBN 978-0-313-37556-9. LCCN 2010022838. OCLC 548555693.
- Standing Committee on Childhood Obesity Prevention; Food and Nutrition Board; Institute of Medicine (2012). Alliances for Obesity Prevention: Finding Common Ground: Workshop Summary. Washington, D.C.: National Academies Press. doi:10.17226/13305. ISBN 978-0-309-22472-7. LCCN 2012405368. OCLC 1073556715. PMID 24872967. Archived from the original on February 4, 2025.
- United States House Committee on Energy and Commerce (2008). Contaminated Food: Private Sector Accountability. Washington, D.C.: United States Government Publishing Office. ISBN 978-0-16-084003-6. LCCN 2009438507. OCLC 1119576112. Archived from the original on February 5, 2025.
- Lippman, David; Stump, Mariah; Veazey, Erica; Guimarães, Sley Tanigawa; Rosenfeld, Richard; Kelly, John H.; Ornish, Dean; Katz, David L. (2024). "Foundations of Lifestyle Medicine and its Evolution". Mayo Clinic Proceedings: Innovations, Quality & Outcomes. 8 (1). Elsevier: 97–111. doi:10.1016/j.mayocpiqo.2023.11.004. ISSN 2542-4548. OCLC 10146331801. PMC 10831813. PMID 38304165. S2CID 267166018.
- Benigas, Susan (2024). "A Milestone: 2024 Marks the 20th Anniversary of the Founding of the American College of Lifestyle Medicine". American Journal of Lifestyle Medicine. 18 (4). Sage Publishing: 449–455. doi:10.1177/15598276241246728. ISSN 1559-8284. OCLC 10370097460. PMC 11384850. PMID 39262881. S2CID 271003145.
- Matin, Maima; Joshi, Tanuj; Greger, Michael; Matin, Farhan Bin; Jóźwik, Artur; Wierzbicka, Agnieszka; Horbańczuk, Jarosław Olav; Willschke, Harald; Atanasov, Atanas G. (2023). "Use of #NutritionFacts to promote evidence-based nutrition information: X (formerly Twitter) hashtag analysis study". Frontiers in Public Health. 11 1255706. Frontiers Media: 1–7. Bibcode:2023FrPH...1155706M. doi:10.3389/fpubh.2023.1255706. ISSN 2296-2565. OCLC 10129725457. PMC 10734685. PMID 38131024. S2CID 266060382.
- Gustafson, Craig (2014). "Michael Greger, md: Reversing Chronic Disease Through Diet; Addressing the 2015 USDA Dietary Guidelines Committee" (PDF). Integrative Medicine: A Clinician's Journal. 13 (2): 22–24. PMC 4684122. PMID 26770088. Archived from the original (PDF) on February 5, 2025.
- Pekosz, Andrew (2007). "Bird flu: A virus of our own hatching". Journal of Clinical Investigation. 117 (9). American Society for Clinical Investigation: 2350. doi:10.1172/JCI33078. ISSN 1558-8238. PMC 1952640.
- Sencer, David J (2007). "Bird Flu: A Virus of Our Own Hatching". Emerging Infectious Diseases (Book review). 13 (11). Centers for Disease Control and Prevention: 1802–1803. doi:10.3201/eid1311.070787. ISSN 1080-6059. PMC 3375804.
