= Burnbrae Farms =

Canadian egg-producing corporation

Burnbrae Farms, Limited
- Type: Private
- Industry: Food – Egg, Egg Products
- Headquarters: Lyn, Ontario
- Website: http://www.burnbraefarms.com/

Burnbrae Farms is a Canadian producer and processor of eggs, supplying grocery store chains, the food service industry, large bakeries and industrial customers. The company has farms in Ontario, Quebec and Manitoba, grading stations across the country (with the exception of Atlantic Canada) and processing operations in Quebec, Ontario and Manitoba.

== Scale and influence ==
In Canada, egg production is regulated under supply management. As of 2016, Burnbrae Farms held or owned an estimated 470,000 units of egg quota, with an implied value of $140 million, valued at $300 per hen. (Note: Rules vary from province to province about whether quota holders technically own their allotted quota or not.) (Note: As a supply managed sector, the estimated value per hen is not determined by free-market dynamics, but is estimated by quota analysts from small volumes under regulated exchange.)

As a substantial quota holder, Burnbrae Farms has a vested interest in outcomes of international trade agreements such as the Trans-Pacific Partnership (TPP) and the Comprehensive and Progressive Agreement for Trans-Pacific Partnership (CPTPP).

Members of the family have held prominent political appointments at the national level.

== History ==
Burnbrae Farms was started in a farm outside the village of Lyn, which is near Brockville, in Eastern Ontario, Canada. Joseph Hudson came to Canada from Stranraer, Scotland in the late 1800s. In 1893, he purchased a farm in Lyn and named it Burnbrae, "Burn" being a Scottish name for a stream and "Brae" a hillside. This is because the farm has a creek, a waterfall and several hillsides sloping down to a valley.

In 1922, Joseph Hudson inherited the farm from his father. At this point, it was primarily a dairy farm. In 1939, Grant Hudson joined his father in running the farm.

While Burnbrae Farms was originally a dairy farm, grandsons of the founder Grant and Joe Hudson helped it evolve into an egg production farm. In 1943, Joe became involved in a poultry school project as a student at Brockville Collegiate Institute. He raised 50 leghorn chicks to laying hens. From 1943 to 1948, the egg layers were a side line managed by Joe and Grant. By 1948, the number of laying hens had increased to 3,000. Eventually the farm's main enterprise became egg production. In 1952, the first laying barn was constructed. In 1956, the barn was expanded to hold 20,000 layers.

In 1973, Burnbrae entered the "further processing" market by establishing a plant in Lyn to break, pasteurize and package eggs that are surplus to the table egg market and sold to the bakery, hotel, restaurant and industrial trade.

In 1974, the company purchased land in St. Zotique, Quebec and built hen barns and a grading operation known as Fermes St. Zotique Ltée. Ferme St. Zotique uses an in-line system in which the grading station grades eggs from the laying hens on the farm. Like the Lyn operation, it also purchases and grades eggs from outside producers.

In 1978, Burnbrae purchased Maple Lynn Foods Limited located outside London, Ontario in Strathroy. It operates a grading station which purchases, grades and markets eggs from many producers in the area. In 1981, Burnbrae built a plant in Mississauga. In Mississauga, the eggs are purchased for grading and distribution from producers in the western Ontario farm belt.

In late 1996 and early 1997 Burnbrae Farms expanded its operation into Manitoba with the purchase of a grading station and a further processing plant. In October 2001, Burnbrae Farms added a grading station in Calgary, Alberta. At Burnbrae Farms Winnipeg and Calgary, eggs are collected from local egg farmers, graded and delivered to stores from North Western Ontario (Thunder Bay) to British Columbia.

In 2006, Burnbrae Farms set up a facility in Brockville, Ontario dedicated to the production of cooked items like omelettes, hard boiled eggs and other egg products.

In 2007, they purchased Island Eggs, based in Vancouver Island.

In 2019, a new solar-powered egg plant was launched. It became the largest in Canada.

In 2020, Burnbrae Farms cooperated with Canadian food banks. The company donated about 4 million eggs.

== Locations ==
- Lyn, Ontario
- Saint-Zotique, Quebec
- Upton, Quebec
- Mississauga, Ontario
- Strathroy, Ontario
- Brockville, Ontario
- Calgary, Alberta
- Winnipeg, Manitoba
- Westholme, British Columbia

== Controversy ==
Burnbrae was linked to two egg farms that were accused of animal cruelty by Mercy for Animals Canada's investigative reporting. They have since publicly dropped those suppliers, pending a full investigation.

Burnbrae Farms has been criticized for poor animal welfare performance and lack of transparency about its egg-sourcing practices. In 2024, Mercy For Animals accused Burnbrae of ambiguities in its reporting that obscure the number of hens kept in cages in its operations. The group objected to Burnbrae’s continued investment in enriched cages despite moves by producers worldwide, such as Noble Foods and Mantiqueira, to transition to cage-free systems. Mercy For Animals also called out the producer’s labeling system, which includes misleading illustrations, such as idyllic open-air pastures and happy cartoons on cartons of eggs sourced from chickens in cages. Burnbrae has since rejected these claims.
