= How Not to Die (book) =

2015 book by Michael Greger

- First edition
- Author: Michael Greger, Gene Stone
- Genre: Non-fiction
- Publisher: Flatiron Books
- Publication date: 2015

How Not to Die: Discover the Foods Scientifically Proven to Prevent and Reverse Disease is a book by Michael Greger, M.D. with Gene Stone, published in 2015 that argues for the health benefits of a whole food plant-based diet. The book was a New York Times Best Seller.

In it, Greger defines a plant-based diet as, "an eating pattern that minimizes the intake of meat, eggs, dairy, and processed junk and maximizes consumption of whole plant foods, such as fruits, vegetables, legumes (beans, split peas, chickpeas, and lentils), whole grains, nuts and seeds, mushrooms, and herbs and spices.”

A revised and updated edition for the book's tenth anniversary was published in December 2025.

== Structure ==
Part 1 of the book consists of 15 chapters. Each chapter is focused on one of the 15 leading causes of death in the United States, and how a whole foods plant-based diet reduces the risk of dying from each cause. Part 2 of the book focuses on the "daily dozen," a list of specific plant based ingredients that Greger suggests improve health and longevity. The daily dozen recommends the following daily portions:

- 3 servings of beans
- 1 serving of berries
- 3 servings of other fruits
- 1 serving of cruciferous vegetables
- 2 servings of greens
- 2 servings of other vegetables
- 1 serving of flaxseeds
- 1 serving of nuts
- 1 serving of spices, particularly turmeric and pepper
- 3 servings of whole grains
- 5 beverages
- 1 exercise

== See also ==
- Neal D. Barnard
- T. Colin Campbell
- Caldwell Esselstyn
- Joel Fuhrman
- Dean Ornish
- List of vegan and plant-based media
- Whole-food, plant-based diet
