= Lisa García Bedolla =

American political scientist

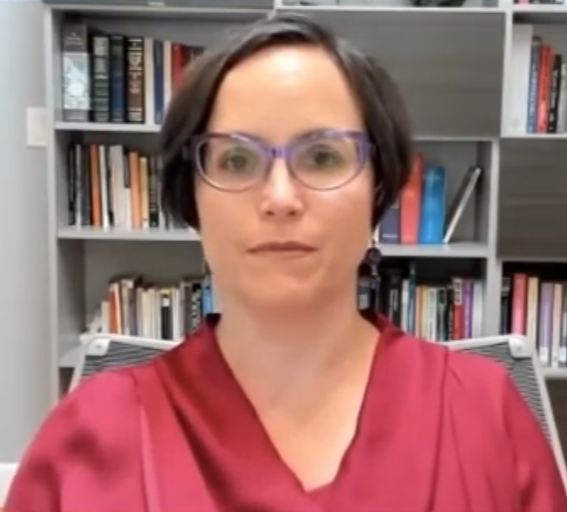
- In an online discussion in 2020
- Education: University of California, Berkeley; Yale University
- Scientific career
- Fields: Political science
- Workplaces: California State University, Long Beach; University of California, Irvine; University of California, Los Angeles; University of California, Berkeley

Lisa García Bedolla is an American political scientist and scholar of Latino studies, currently the Vice Provost for Graduate Studies and Dean of the Graduate Division at the University of California, Berkeley, and a professor in the UC Berkeley Graduate School of Education. García Bedolla studies political inequalities, political participation, and Latino political engagement and mobilization in the United States.

== Education ==
García Bedolla graduated from the University of California, Berkeley in 1992 with a BA in Latin American Studies and Comparative Literature. She then attended Yale University for graduate degrees in political science, obtaining an MA in 1993, an MPhil in 1995, and a PhD in 1999.

== Career ==
García Bedolla was a professor at California State University, Long Beach from 1999 until 2001, when she moved to the University of California, Irvine. She remained there until 2008, and from 2004-2006 was also affiliated with the Chicano Studies Research Center at the University of California, Los Angeles. In 2008, she moved to University of California, Berkeley, becoming the Chair of the Center for Latino Policy Research from 2010-2014 and a Chancellor’s Professor in the Graduate School of Education from 2014-2017. Since 2017, she has been the Director of the Institute of Governmental Studies at UC Berkeley. In 2019, she was appointed Berkeley's Vice Provost for Graduate Studies & Dean of the Graduate Division.

In 2005, García Bedolla published the book Fluid Borders: Latino Power, Identity, and Politics in Los Angeles. In this book, García Bedolla analyzed evidence from "over a hundred semi-structured interviews of students in the predominantly Latino neighborhoods of East Los Angeles and Montebello, California" on topics like identity, political engagement, and the 1994 California Proposition 187. This was reviewed as being one of the first academic works to move beyond simple heuristics or stereotypes about Latino political behaviour and instead develop a complex theoretical framework for understanding Latino politics.

García Bedolla also wrote a textbook, called Latino Politics, originally published in 2009 and now in its third edition. The text focuses on Latino groups from five different places of origin: Mexico, Puerto Rico, Cuba, El Salvador, and Guatemala. It begins with the history of immigration of each group in the context of how American policies have affected each region, examines the rights and opportunities of each group in the United States, and then traces the evolution of their political activity.

García Bedolla coauthored the 2012 book Mobilizing Inclusion: Transforming the Electorate through Get-Out-the-Vote Campaigns with Melissa R. Michelson. They present 250 randomized experiments, conducted from 2006 to 2008, to understand what works in mobilizing Latino voters, in the context of low rates of voter participation by several minority groups in the United States. García Bedolla's fourth book is written with Taylor N. Carlson and Marisa Abrajano, and called Talking Politics: Political Discussion Networks and the New American Electorate, with a publication date in 2020.

García Bedolla has been an editor for numerous journals. She is a member of the 2020-2024 editorial leadership of the American Political Science Review, which is the most selective political science journal.

García Bedolla has written several articles about voter contact and immigration for prominent news publications like The New York Times, and has been frequently cited as an expert in news stories about American politics. Together with her husband José Luis Bedolla, García Bedolla established and funded the Miguel and Elvira Bedolla Scholarship to support undocumented students at UC Berkeley.

== Selected works ==
- Fluid Borders: Latino Power, Identity, and Politics in Los Angeles (2005)
- Latino Politics (2009)
- Mobilizing Inclusion: Transforming the Electorate through Get-Out-the-Vote Campaigns (2012)
- Talking Politics: Political Discussion Networks and the New American Electorate (2020)

== Selected awards ==
- 2000 Race, Ethnicity and Politics Section Best Dissertation Award, American Political Science Association
- 2006 Ralph J. Bunche Award, American Political Science Association, for the book Fluid Borders
- 2012 Best Book Award, American Political Science Association Latino Caucus, for the book Latino Politics
- 2013 Ralph J. Bunche Award, American Political Science Association, for the book Mobilizing Inclusion
- 2017 UC Berkeley Chancellor’s Award for Advancing Institutional Excellence and Equity
