= Tracye McQuirter =

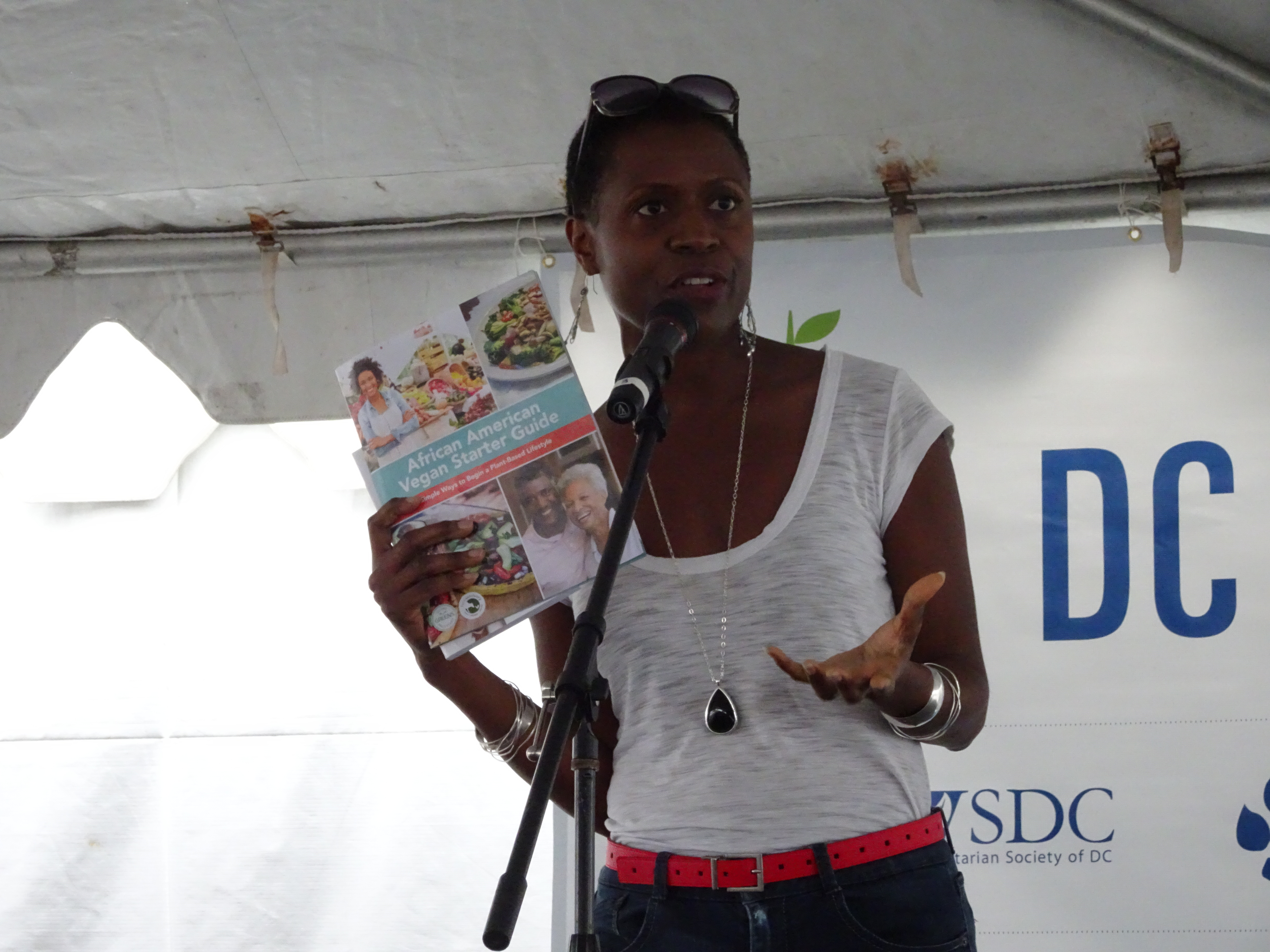
- Born: Washington, DC
- Education: New York University (MPH, Public Health Nutrition); Amherst College (BA, African American Studies); Sidwell Friends School
- Occupations: Public Health Nutritionist; Vegan Activist; Author speaker
- Writing career
- Genres: Vegan Education, Activism, Lifestyle
- Notable works: Ageless Vegan (2018); By Any Greens Necessary (2010) “African Vegan Starter Guide” (2015)
- Website: byanygreensnecessary.com

Tracye McQuirter is an American public health nutritionist and vegan/plant-based author who appears in the 2024 documentary You Are What You Eat: A Twin Experiment.

== Background ==
McQuirter grew up in Washington D.C. and graduated from Sidwell Friends School in 1984. She received her B.A. from Amherst College in 1988 and her Masters in Public Health Nutrition (MPH) from New York University in 2003.

== Career ==
Actor and activist Dick Gregory introduced McQuirter to vegetarianism in 1986 when he gave a talk on the subject at Amherst during her sophomore year. When she was a junior, she spent a semester in Kenya and had experiences there that made her decide to become a vegetarian. During her second semester, when she was an exchange student at Howard University, she discovered what she later described as a "large Black vegan and vegetarian community in Washington D.C." This group, which was also influenced by Gregory and his book Dick Gregory’s Natural Diet for Folks Who Eat: Cookin’ With Mother Nature, taught her how to be a vegan. However, at that time McQuirter notes that, "there were not a lot of options in terms of grocery stores. There was no Whole Foods... we had to basically cook everything for ourselves."

McQuirter co-founded "BlackVegetarians.com" (1996-1997), the first vegan website by and for African Americans.

According to The New York Times, her 2010 book, By Any Greens Necessary contributed to the rise of veganism among African-Americans between the time of its release and 2017 (when the article was published). She also co-authored the African American Vegan Starter Guide in 2016 with the Farm Sanctuary.

== Honors ==
Vegetarian Times named her a "New Food Hero" in 2017, and Self Magazine listed her cookbook Ageless Vegan as one of the "16 Best Healthy Cookbooks" of 2018. In 2019, she was inducted into the U.S. Animal Rights Hall of Fame and PBS named her a "Woman Thought Leader." In 2024, VegNews listed McQuirter as one of the "17 Black Vegan Chefs Redefining Plant-Based Food and Community."

== Bibliography ==
- McQuirter, Tracye (2018). Ageless Vegan: The Secret to Living a Long and Healthy Plant-Based Life. Da Capo Lifelong Books. p. 256. ISBN 978-0738220208.
- McQuirter, Tracye (2010). By Any Greens Necessary: A Revolutionary Guide for Black Women Who Want to Eat Great, Get Healthy, Lose Weight, and Look Phat. Lawrence Hill Books. p. 240. ISBN 978-1556529986.
