= Gene Baur =

American author and activist (born 1962)

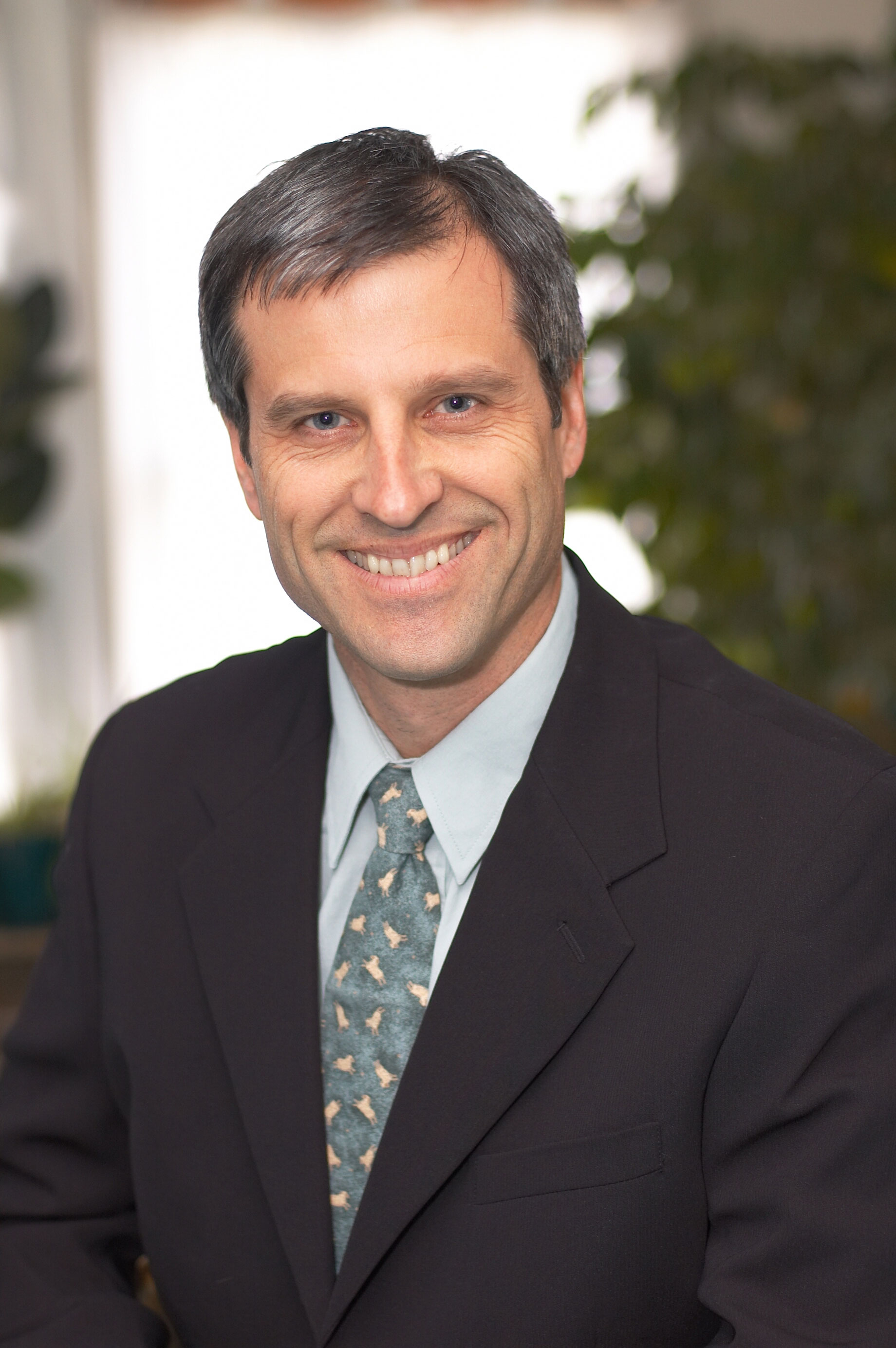
- Baur in 2007
- Born: July 24, 1962 (age 64); Los Angeles, California, U.S.
- Education: California State University, Northridge; Cornell University
- Occupations: Activist; author
- Years active: 1986–present
- Spouse: Lorri Houston (m. 1985, divorced)

Gene Baur (born July 24, 1962), formerly known as Gene Bauston, is an American author and activist in the animal rights and food movement. He’s been called the "conscience of the food movement" by Time magazine, and opposes factory farming and advocates for what he believes would be a more just and respectful food system. Baur is president and co-founder of Farm Sanctuary, a farm animal protection organization. He is vegan and has been involved with animal rights since he co-founded Farm Sanctuary in 1986. Baur has authored two books and various articles.

== Early life and education ==
Baur was born in Los Angeles and grew up in Hollywood, California, the oldest of six siblings. He went to Loyola High School. He attended Cal State Northridge where he obtained a bachelor's degree in sociology. He paid for college, in part, by doing background work in television and movies which included commercials for McDonald's and KFC.

To better understand agribusiness and its mindset, Baur obtained a master's degree in agricultural economics from Cornell University.

== Animal rights work ==
=== Farm Sanctuary ===
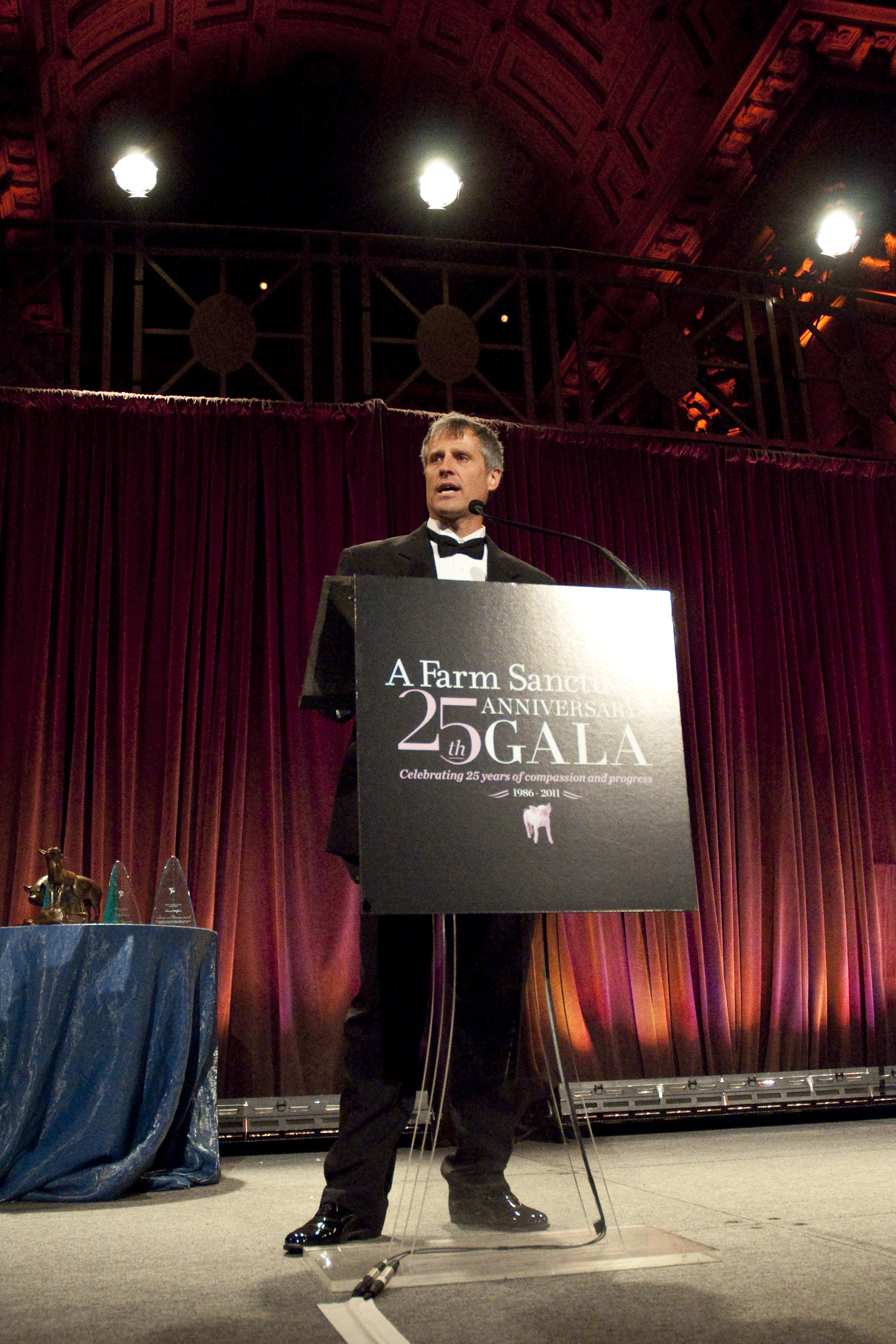
Gene Baur at the Farm Sanctuary 25th Anniversary Gala in New York City

In the 1980s, after traveling around the United States and learning about agriculture, Baur began investigations into factory farms, stockyards, and slaughterhouses. He believed the conditions he observed were unacceptable, and these experiences helped motivate the creation of Farm Sanctuary, which created the sanctuary movement in North America.

Farm Sanctuary's first rescued animal was a downed (i.e. unable to stand) sheep who had been discarded on a pile of dead animals behind Lancaster stockyards in Pennsylvania in 1986. The sheep, who regained her health and lived for more than ten years, was named Hilda. Farm Sanctuary continued to investigate farms, speak out against factory farming, and rescue animals, funding the fledgling organization by selling vegan hotdogs out of a VW van in the parking lots at Grateful Dead concerts.

Baur has expressed concern about the impact factory farming has on the environment, on workers and consumers, and on rural communities. He has visited communities and witnessed the impact of large scale animal agriculture.

=== Legislative action ===
Baur has testified before local, state and federal legislative bodies and spoken to farming and policy organizations in efforts to reform the industry and improve farm animal welfare. In 2004, Baur gave a talk entitled "Animal Rights and Human Responsibility" at the United States Department of Agriculture headquarters in Washington, D.C., and in 2007, he was called to testify before the U.S. House agriculture subcommittee on Livestock, Dairy and Poultry about the inhumane conditions common on factory farms.

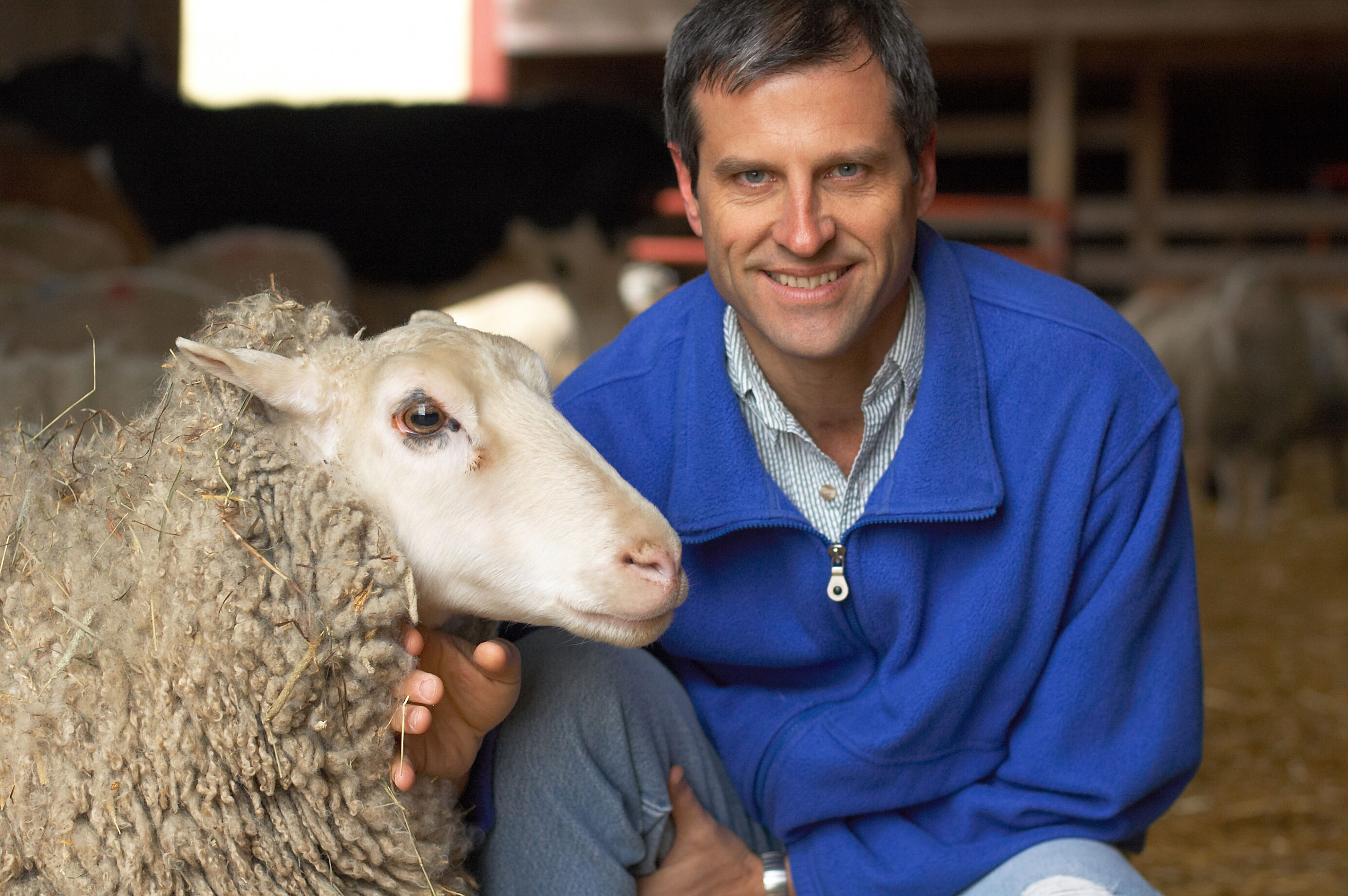
Baur in 2007

==== Farm animal confinement ====
Baur played a role in passing the first U.S. laws to restrict industrial animal farming systems. In 2002, Baur led a campaign in Florida to pass a ballot initiative banning gestation crates for pigs. After the Florida campaign the Florida Elections Commission found that Farm Sanctuary, and Baur personally, had broken campaign finance laws. Farm Sanctuary and Baur consented to pay a fine of $50,000.

In 2006, Baur was involved in getting a ballot measure introduced and passed in Arizona which banned gestation crates and veal crates. Baur and Farm Sanctuary were also sponsors of a California initiative (Proposition 2) to ban veal crates, gestation crates and battery cages which passed on November 4, 2008, approved with over 63% of the vote.

==== Foie gras ====
Baur played a role in a California law that went into effect in 2012, banning the production and sale of foie gras, which is made by force feeding ducks and geese and causing their livers to expand up to ten times their normal size. He was also involved in passing a 2006 (repealed in 2008) Chicago ordinance banning the sale of foie gras.

=== Vegan advocacy ===
In 2012, Baur started competing in marathons and triathlons to demonstrate how plant foods can fuel athletic performance. In July 2013, Baur participated in his first full Ironman Triathlon in Lake Placid, New York. As a vegan runner, Baur was featured in the May 2013 issue of Runner's World magazine.

Baur participated in an Intelligence Squared debate on December 4, 2013, along with Neal D. Barnard of the Physicians Committee for Responsible Medicine arguing for the motion "Don't Eat Anything with a Face." Debating against the motion during the Oxford–style debate were Chris Masterjohn of the Weston A. Price Foundation and farmer Joel Salatin. The Baur/Bernard team was declared the winner after the majority of the audience voted in favor of their position.

Baur was also interviewed on Tony Robbins' Blog and was regarded as "The Change Cultivator" which featured him as a man on a mission to change cultural norms about the way society views animals and as someone who is influential in promoting a plant-based lifestyle.

=== Media appearances ===
Baur's investigative exposés and advocacy activities have been covered by ABC, NBC, CBS, CNN, Time magazine, the Los Angeles Times, The New York Times and The Daily Show with Jon Stewart. In the early 1990s, Baur debated a meat industry representative on Larry King Live. Baur has been featured in documentaries, including Forks Over Knives and A Cow at My Table. He was an associate producer of the 2011 documentary, Vegucated. Also in 2011, Baur appeared on The Martha Stewart Show's hour-long episode on veganism. In 2016, Baur was selected by Oprah Winfrey as an "inspired leader" honoree of Oprah Winfrey Network's “SuperSoul 100".

=== Books ===
In 2002, Baur wrote a chapter for A Primer on Animal Rights: Leading Experts Write about Animal Cruelty and Exploitation, edited by Kim Stallwood.

Baur was cited in the book, The Longest Struggle: From Pythagoras to PETA by Norm Phelps, published in 2007.

Farm Sanctuary: Changing Hearts and Minds About Animals and Food, was released in March 2008, written by Gene Baur, and published by Simon & Schuster. It appeared on bestseller lists including those of the Los Angeles Times and The Boston Globe, and it was named as one of Booklist's Top 10 Sci-Tech Books in 2008.

In the book, Eating Animals (2009), Baur was interviewed by author, Jonathan Safran Foer, about how he started Farm Sanctuary and his first rescue of downed sheep, Hilda.

In 2011, Baur was included as a contributor in Forks Over Knives, a documentary film about plant-based eating and health. The film has resulted in a website, companion book and cookbook for healthy eating.

In Voices of the Food Revolution, a book about healing through food which was published in 2013, Baur was interviewed by author, John Robbins.

Baur also wrote a chapter for Running, Eating, Thinking - A Vegan Anthology (2014), edited by Martin Rowe, which delves into the mindset and dietary choices of vegan athletic runners.

Living the Farm Sanctuary Life: The Ultimate Guide to Eating Mindfully, Living Longer, and Feeling Better Every Day, is Baur's second book, coauthored with Gene Stone (author of Forks Over Knives), and was published in April 2015 and includes 100 vegan recipes selected by chefs and celebrities. It is Winner of a Books for a Better Life Award, appeared on Publishers Weekly's national bestsellers list and was named the 2015 book of the year by VegNews magazine.

In 2016, Baur wrote the foreword for the book, Vegan 1 Day: Stories of Living the Good Life by John and Carol Merryfield.

=== Awards ===
In 1996, the Peace Abbey awarded Baur with its Courage of Conscience Award. He was inducted into the United States Animal Rights Hall of Fame in 2001.

Baur received the 2017 Peace Award at the Golden West College's Peace and Equity Conference "for his lifelong dedication to animal welfare, sustainable farming practices, and compassion for all living beings."

== Books ==
- Bauston (Baur), Gene (October 1, 1996) Battered Birds, Crated Herds: How We Treat the Animals We Eat. Farm Sanctuary. ISBN 978-0965637701.
- Baur, Gene. Forward. Peace to All Beings: Veggie Soup for the Chicken's Soul by Judy Carman, (June 1, 2003). Lantern Books. ISBN 978-1590560051.
- Baur, Gene (November 4, 2008). Farm Sanctuary: Changing Hearts and Minds About Animals and Food. Touchstone. ISBN 978-0743291590.
- Baur, Gene; Stone, Gene (April 7, 2015). Living the Farm Sanctuary Life: The Ultimate Guide to Eating Mindfully, Living Longer, and Feeling Better Every Day. Rodale Books. ISBN 978-1623364892.

== See also ==
- List of animal rights advocates
- List of vegans
