= Christopher D. Gardner =

American nutrition researcher (born 1959)

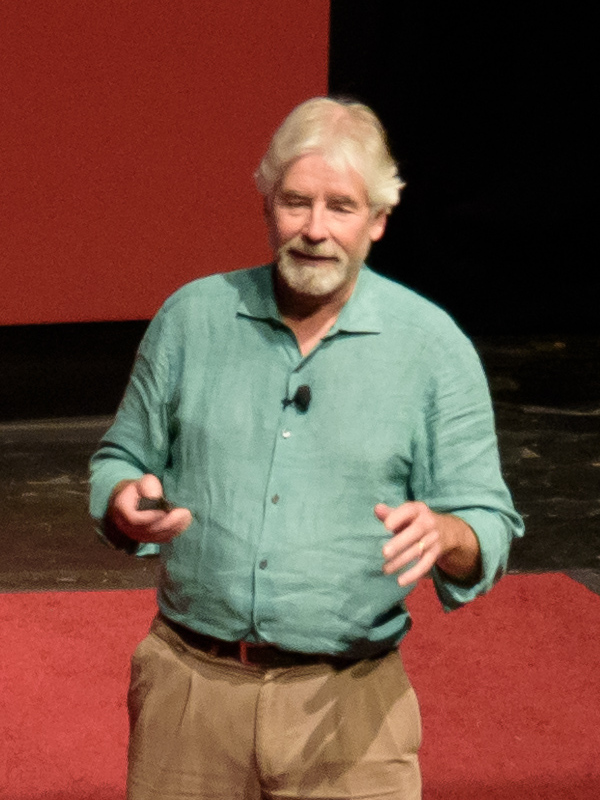
- Born: July 13, 1959 (age 67); Washington, D.C.
- Spouse: Melissa R. Michelson
- Children: 4

Academic background
- Education: B.A., Philosophy, 1981, Colgate University; MA, PhD, Nutrition Science, 1993, University of California, Berkeley
- Thesis: Acculturation and cardiovascular disease risk factors in immigrant hispanic men (1993)
- Website: https://med.stanford.edu/nutrition.html

Christopher David Gardner (born July 13, 1959) is an American nutrition researcher. He is the director of nutrition studies at the Stanford Prevention Research Center and the Rehnborg Farquhar Professor of Medicine at Stanford University.

Gardner is involved with the American Diabetes Association (ADA) and the American Heart Association (AHA). In 2019, he was co-author of updated nutrition guidelines for the ADA. He served as a member of the AHA's Nutrition Committee from 2009 to 2013, and in 2020 he was appointed as a member of the AHA Lifestyle & Metabolic Health Council, and to a leadership position in the AHA Nutrition Committee (2020-2026). He appeared in the 2024 Netflix documentary You Are What You Eat: A Twin Experiment, about his Stanford University twins study. Gardner is an advocate and researcher of plant-based dietary patterns.

== Early life and education ==
Gardner was born on July 13, 1959, in Washington, D.C. After earning his Bachelor of Arts degree in philosophy from Colgate University, he spent two years completing undergraduate science courses at the University of California, Davis and the University of California, Berkeley to qualify for a master's degree program in nutrition. Upon becoming eligible, he was accepted into the PhD program of Nutrition Science at the University of California, Berkeley.

== Career ==
Upon completing a postdoctoral fellowship at Stanford University, Gardner accepted a position at the institution. As an assistant research professor of medicine, Gardner collaborated with John W. Farquhar to study the effectiveness of ginkgo biloba supplements to treat peripheral artery disease. The following year, he received a grant from the National Institutes of Health to study whether fresh garlic and garlic supplements lower cholesterol. As an assistant professor of medicine at the Stanford Prevention Research Center, Gardner led the first independent, long-term, head-to-head assessment of raw garlic and garlic supplements. He also oversaw the largest and longest-ever comparison of Atkins, Zone, LEARN or Ornish diets to see which led to the greatest weight loss and changes in cardiometabolic risk factors. A follow-up to this study was the DIETFITS trial that compared a Healthy Low-Fat to a Healthy Low-Carbohydrate study with over 600 women and men. This landmark study tested whether there is a predisposition to success on one diet or the other based on either a potential genetic pattern or a metabolic condition known as insulin resistance.

Gardner teaches a basic Human Nutrition class (HumBio 130), a Food and Society class (HumBio 166), and a Healthy and Sustainable Food Systems class (HumBio 113S) at Stanford. From 2010 and 2015, he convened a series of annual Stanford Food Summits that involved faculty, students and researchers from across Stanford's seven schools. These interests led him to be invited to join the Scientific Advisory Board of the Menus of Change, a collaboration between The Culinary Institute of America and Harvard T.H. Chan School of Public Health's Nutrition Department. He is also the co-founder of a spin-off of this group, the Menus of Change University Research Collaborative, a group of colleges and universities using campus dining halls as living laboratories to explore opportunities to make changes in eating patterns at those institutions. These activities have led to research studies and publications. In 2019, Gardner collaborated with a research team that included a food business consultant, an environmental scientist and a botanist to publish a review of protein requirements, current intakes, and potential beneficial impacts on the environment that would be realized in the US if protein intakes were lowered and shifted toward a more plant-based diet.

Gardner is involved with the American Diabetes Association (ADA) and the American Heart Association (AHA). In 2019, he was an invited co-author of updated nutrition guidelines for the ADA. He served as a member of the AHA's Nutrition Committee from 2009 to 2013, and in 2020 he was appointed as a member of the AHA Lifestyle & Metabolic Health Council, and to a leadership position in the AHA Nutrition Committee.

Gardner was appointed the Rehnborg Farquhar Professor of Medicine at Stanford which supports research in disease prevention in June 2017. During the COVID-19 pandemic, Gardner found that replacing red meat with plant-based meat alternatives could lower some cardiovascular risk factors. He also grew his interests in microbiome by collaborating with Stanford microbiologists, Justin Sonnenburg and Erica Sonnenburg, on several studies and with other microbiome researchers.

In 2023, Gardner co-authored a scientific statement from the American Heart Association on popular dietary patterns and alignment with their 2021 dietary guidance. The DASH diet, Mediterranean diet, pescetarian and vegetarian eating patterns received top ratings for aligning with the Association’s dietary guidance whilst low-carbohydrate diet's scored poorly as they do not rank as heart-healthy eating patterns.

In 2023, Gardner published research on cardiometabolic risk factors in pairs of identical twins randomized to follow either a vegan or omnivorous diet. The study found that a vegan diet was associated with statistically significant reductions in LDL cholesterol and fasting insulin levels. This study is the subject of the 2024 Netflix documentary You Are What You Eat: A Twin Experiment.

== Personal life ==
Gardner and his wife Melissa, a political scientist, have four sons together and all follow a plant-based diet. One of Gardner’s sons, Jackson Gardner, completed his PhD at University of California, San Francisco, specializing in the microbiology of the gut microbiome.

== Selected publications ==
- Gardner CD, Vadiveloo MK, Petersen KS, Anderson CA, Springfield S, Van Horn L, Khera A, Lamendola C, Mayo SM, Joseph JJ (2023). "Popular Dietary Patterns: Alignment With American Heart Association 2021 Dietary Guidance: A Scientific Statement From the American Heart Association". Circulation. 147 (22): 1715–1730. doi:10.1161/CIR.0000000000001146. PMID 37128940.
- Gardner, Christopher D.; Ward, Catherine P.; Cunanan, Kristen M.; Durand, Lindsay R.; Perelman, Dalia; Robinson, Jennifer L.; Hennings, Tayler; Koh, Linda; Dant, Christopher; Zeitlin, Amanda; Ebel, Emily R.; Sonnenburg, Erica D.; Sonnenburg, Justin L.; Landry, Matthew J. (2023). "Cardiometabolic Effects of Omnivorous vs Vegan Diets in Identical Twins". JAMA Network Open. 6 (11): e2344457. doi:10.1001/jamanetworkopen.2023.44457. PMC 10690456. PMID 38032644.
