= Gene Stone =

American writer (born 1951)

Gene R. Stone
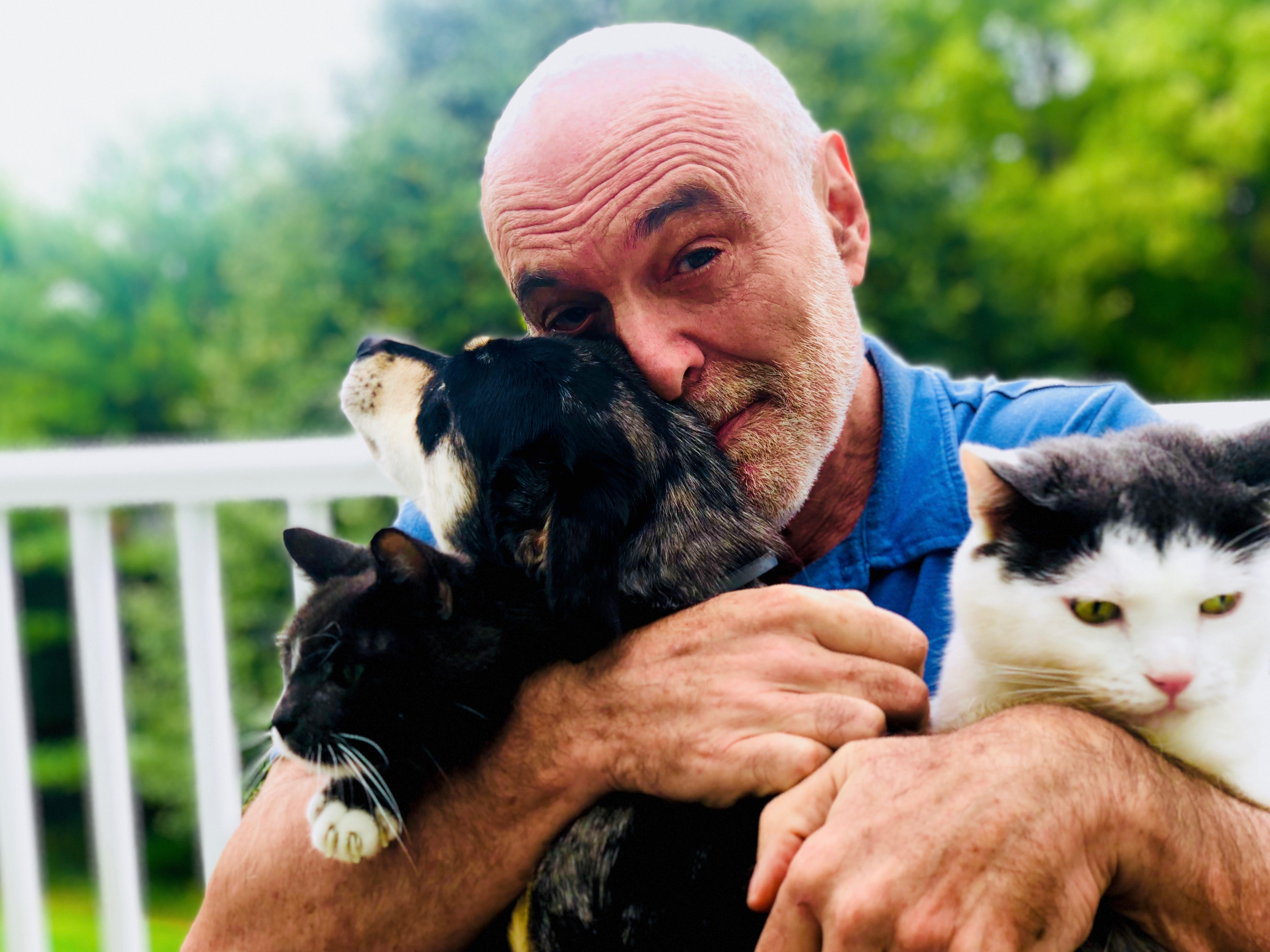
- Born: October 6, 1951 (age 74)
- Education: Stanford University (BA); Harvard University (MA)
- Known for: Best-selling author, plant-based eating, gay advocacy, animal rights
- Board member of: Surgeons Over Seas (SOS) and Truth Wins Out (TWO)
- Awards: Books for a Better Life Award (twice), VegNews Book of the Year (twice), Humane League Hero of the Year, 2016
- Website: www.genestone.com

Gene Stone (born October 6, 1951) is an American writer and editor known for his books on animal rights and plant-based food.

== Early life and editorial career ==
Gene Stone grew up in the Westchester County suburb of Pelham, New York, the son of lawyer Henry Stone and author Babette Rosmond, and the brother of James Stone, founder and CEO of Plymouth Rock Assurance Corporation. After graduating Phi Beta Kappa from Stanford and receiving his master's degree in English Literature from Harvard, Stone joined the Peace Corps, where he spent two years in the Republic of Niger. Returning to New York, he then started a career as an editor. He began at Harcourt Brace, where he edited a wide range of books including Patricia Bosworth's biography of Montgomery Clift. He then worked at Bantam Books, where he helped launch its hardcover division by acquiring such books as Albert Goldman's biography of John Lennon and Kareem Abdul-Jabbar's autobiography. Next, he worked as a senior editor at Esquire, editing authors ranging from Alan Furst and Bobbie Ann Mason to Michael Kinsley and Joel Kotkin. He then moved to Los Angeles, where he was West Coast editor of Simon & Schuster, a consulting editor at the Los Angeles Times, and editor in chief of California Magazine.

== Writing career ==
In 1988 Stone began a career as a writer and ghostwriter. He has written extensively for magazines, including New York Esquire, GQ, and Vogue, but eventually dedicated his livelihood to books. His first ghostwritten project was for the Nicaraguan politician Arturo Cruz Jr., Memoirs of a Counter-Revolutionary (1988). Since then Stone has written more than forty books with a diverse group of people, including theoretical physicist Stephen Hawking, former Yahoo! Chief Solutions Officer Tim Sanders, medical director of Canyon Ranch Resorts Mark Liponis, CNN executive vice-president Gail Evans, and TOMS Shoes founder Blake Mycoskie (The #1 New York Times bestseller Start Something That Matters).

Stone has written many other books under his own name, including, The Secret of People Who Never Get Sick, which has been translated into more than 30 languages; and Little Girl Fly Away, which he co-produced as a television movie. An avid watch collector, Stone appeared on CBS News Sunday Morning (October 29, 2006) discussing his book, The Watch, the definitive book of men's wristwatches. The book was thoroughly updated and published in a new edition in 2018 with a new co-author, Hodinkee.com managing editor Stephen Pulvirent. Stone has also written a number of instant books for various publishers on presidential politics, including the #1 Washington Post bestseller The Bush Survival Bible and the #1 Los Angeles Times bestseller The Trump Survival Guide. Stone serves on the board of several not-for-profit organizations, including Surgeons Over Seas (SOS), which saves lives in developing countries by improving surgical care, and Truth Will Out (TWO), a non-profit think tank and educational organization that defends the LGBT community against anti-gay misinformation. He has also written about his own experiences with conversion therapy and sexual surrogacy for New York Magazine, (The Tiger Cure).

== Plant-based writing ==
In 2006 Stone, a vegan, met firefighter Rip Esselstyn, and the two of them collaborated on the hugely successful book about a low-fat, whole foods, plant-based diet, The Engine 2 Diet, which in turn was the basis of a product line at Whole Foods Market. They then co-wrote two bestselling sequels. Under his own name, Stone wrote the companion book to the documentary Forks Over Knives, a film which also explores plant-based diets that was a #1 New York Times bestseller. Over the last fifteen years Stone has ghostwritten, co-written, or authored many other books on plant-based diets and their relationship to health, animal protection, and the environment, many of which have been national bestsellers. These include Living the Farm Sanctuary Life, with Farm Sanctuary President and Co-founder Gene Baur; How Not To Die with Dr. Michael Greger (which was followed up with a cookbook); Mercy for Animals (with Mercy for Animals founder Nathan Runkle); Animalkind (co-authored with PETA co-founder Ingrid Newkirk); Eat for the Planet and Eat for the Planet Cookbook (co-authored with www.onegreenplanet.com founder Nil Zacharias); Rescue Dogs, with undercover animal investigator Pete Paxton; Healthy at Last, with Eric Adams, Mayor of New York City; and 72 Reasons to be Vegan with Kathy Freston.

== Works ==
- 1989 Memoirs of a Counter-Revolutionary (Ghostwriter for Arturo Cruz), Doubleday, ISBN 9780385248792
- 1992 Stephen Hawking's A Brief History of Time: A Reader’s Companion (in collaboration with Stephen Hawking), Bantam, ISBN 978-0553077728
- 1994 Little Girl Fly Away, Simon & Schuster, ISBN 9780671780852
- 1997 Dr Fulford's Touch of Life (co-writer with osteopath Robert C. Fulford), Gallery, ISBN 9780671556013
- 1998 The Halo Effect: How Volunteering Can Lead to a More Fulfilling Life and a Better Career (co-written with Outward Bound CEO John Reynolds), Golden Books Adult Publishing, ISBN 9780307440716
- 2000 Play Like a Man, Win Like a Woman (Ghostwriter with CNN executive VP Gail Evans), Broadway, ISBN 9780767904636
- 2002 Kindred Spirits: How the Remarkable Bond Between Humans and Animals Can Change the Way we Live, (Ghostwriter for veterinarian Allen Shoen), Broadway, ISBN 9780767904315
- 2002 Love is the Killer App (Ghostwriter for Yahoo! Chief Solutions Officer Tim Sanders), Crown Business, ISBN 9781400046836
- 2003 UltraPrevention (Ghostwriter for Mark Hyman and Mark Liponis- Medical Directors of Canyon Ranch), Scribners, ISBN 9780743448833
- 2004 The Bush Survival Bible, Villard, ISBN 0-8129-7476-X
- 2006 The Watch – First Edition, Harry N. Abrams, ISBN 9780810930933
- 2007 Ultralongevity: The Seven Step Program for a Younger, Healthier You (co-writer with Canyon Ranch Medical Director Mark Liponis), Little, Brown and Company, ISBN 9780316017299
- 2007 Duck! The Dick Cheney Survival Bible, Villard, ISBN 9780812977295
- 2008 Saving the World at Work (Ghostwriter for Yahoo! CSO Tim Sanders), Crown Business, ISBN 9780385523578
- 2009 The Engine 2 Diet (written with Rip Esselstyn), Grand Central, ISBN 9780446506687
- 2010 The Secrets of People Who Never Get Sick, Workman, ISBN 9780761165811
- 2011 Start Something That Matters (Ghostwriter for TOMS Shoes founder Blake Mycoskie), Random House, ISBN 9780812981445
- 2011 Forks Over Knives: The Plant-Based Way to Health (Editor), The Experiment ISBN 9781615190454
- 2013 Finding the Next Steve Jobs (Co-author with Atari and Chuck E. Cheese Founder Nolan Bushnell), Simon & Schuster, ISBN 9781476759821
- 2013 My Beef With Meat (Ghostwriter for Rip Esselstyn), Grand Central, ISBN 9781455509362
- 2014 The Awareness (co-written with Jon Doyle), Stone, ISBN 9780615944647
- 2015 How Not to Die (co-written with Michael Greger) Flatiron, ISBN 9781250066114
- 2015 Living the Farm Sanctuary Life (co-written with Farm Sanctuary founder Gene Baur) Rodale, ISBN 9781623364892
- 2017 The Trump Survival Guide Dey Street, ISBN 9780062686480
- 2017 Mercy for Animals (co-writer with Mercy for Animals founder Nathan Runkle), Avery, ISBN 9780399574054
- 2017 The How Not do Die Cookbook (Co-writer with Michael Greger, M.D.), Flatiron, ISBN 9781250127761
- 2017 Mercy for Animals (Co-writer with Mercy for Animals founder Nathan Runkle), Avery,ISBN 0399574050
- 2017 Mercy for Animals (Co-writer with Mercy for Animals founder Nathan Runkle), Avery,ISBN 0399574050
- 2017 The How Not To Die Cookbook (Co-writer with Dr. Michael Greger) Flatiron, ISBN 9781529010817
- 2018 Eat for the Planet (co-writer with OneGreenPlanet.org founder Nil Zacharias), Abrams ISBN 9781419729102
- 2018 The Watch, Thoroughly Revised (co-writer with Stephen Pulvirent), Abrams, ISBN 9781419732607
- 2018 Eat for the Planet (With OneGreenPlanet.org founder Nil Zacharias), Abrams, ISBN 9781419729102
- 2019 Rescue Dogs (Co-writer with undercover animal abuse investigator “Pete Paxton”), Penguin Books, ISBN 9780525540359
- 2020 Animalkind (With PETA co-founder Ingrid Newkirk) Simon and Schuster, ISBN 9781501198557
- 2020 Eat for the Planet Cookbook (with OneGreenPlanet founder Nil Zacharias), Abrams, ISBN 9781419734410
- 2020 Healthy at Last (Ghostwriter for New York City Mayor Eric Adams), Hay House, ISBN 9781401962210
- 2021 72 Reasons to Be Vegan (With bestselling Veganist author Kathy Freston), Workman, ISBN 9781523510313
- 2025 Wild on Purpose (Ghostwriter for American Prairie Founder Sean Gerrity), Torrey House, ISBN 979-8890920348
- 2025 Vegana Italiana (Co-writer for Pura Vita Restaurant chef/owner Tara Punzone), Rodale, ISBN 978-0593736173
