= Melissa R. Michelson =

American political scientist

- Education: Columbia University; Yale University
- Spouse: Christopher D. Gardner
- Awards: Jane Mansbridge Award, APSA; Distinguished Career Award, MPSA
- Scientific career
- Fields: Political science
- Workplaces: Lawrence University; University of Illinois, Chicago; California State University, Fresno; California State University, East Bay; Menlo College; Stanford University

Melissa R. Michelson is an American political scientist. She is a professor of political science at Menlo College, and in July 2020 she became the Dean of Arts and Sciences there. She studies voter mobilization and engagement in the United States, particularly among minority communities, as well as public opinion and political communication.

== Education and early work ==
Michelson attended Columbia University, graduating with a BA in political science in 1990. She then attended graduate school at Yale University, earning an MA in 1991, an MPhil in 1994, and a PhD in 1994, all in political science.

After receiving her PhD in 1994, Michelson became a professor of political science at Lawrence University, where she remained for one year. In 1995, she moved to the political science faculty at the University of Illinois, Chicago, where she worked until 1999. She then joined the political science faculty at California State University, Fresno, moving in 2004 to California State University, East Bay. In 2010 she became a professor of political science at Menlo College, and a lecturer at Stanford University.

== Career ==
Michelson has published five co-authored books. Her first book, written with Lisa García Bedolla in 2012, was called Mobilizing inclusion: Transforming the electorate through Get-Out-the-Vote campaigns. In 250 randomized experiments, which the authors conducted between 2006 and 2008, they test what techniques work to mobilize Latino voters, in the context of low rates of voter participation by several minority groups in the United States. Mobilizing inclusion received the 2013 Ralph J. Bunche Award from the American Political Science Association, which "honors the best scholarly work in political science that explores the phenomenon of ethnic and cultural pluralism". Mobilizing inclusion also won the 2013 Best Book Award from the Race, Ethnicity and Politics section of the American Political Science Association.

Michelson's second book, Living the Dream: New Immigration Policies and the Lives of Undocumented Latino Youth, was co-authored with Maria Chávez-Pringle and Jessica Lavariega Monforti, and published in 2014. Living the dream studied the effects of the Deferred Action for Childhood Arrivals program, which mandated deferred action from deportation for some undocumented immigrants who were brought into the United States when they were children.

Michelson was also an author of two books that were published in 2017: A Matter of Discretion: The Politics of Catholic Priests in the United States and Ireland (with Brian R. Calfano and Elizabeth A. Oldmixon), which employs surveys and a field experiment to test how Roman Catholic clergy choose political acts to participate in, and Listen, We Need to Talk: How to Change Attitudes about LGBT Rights (with Brian F. Harrison), which uses randomized experimentation to test a new theory about the dramatic shift in public opinion regarding LGBT rights in the United States over the preceding 3 decades. Michelson also became an author of the book Governing California in the Twenty-First Century in the book's seventh edition. In 2016, Michelson received the Jane Mansbridge Award from the Women's Caucus of the American Political Science Association, together with the other board members of the Women Also Know Stuff project, which promotes the citation and recognition of women who are experts in political science topics. In 2019, Michelson was given the Distinguished Career Award from the Latino Caucus of the Midwest Political Science Association. She has also multiple times received the Dean's Scholarship Award at Menlo College, and several Best Paper awards at major conferences.

Michelson's commentary on topics like American political participation and American public opinion appears frequently in media outlets, including The Washington Post, ABC News, The New York Times, and Univision.

In May 2020, it was announced that Michelson had been named the Dean of Arts and Sciences at Menlo College, with a term beginning in July 2020.

== Selected works ==
- Mobilizing inclusion: Transforming the electorate through Get-Out-the-Vote campaigns, co-author (2012)
- Living the Dream: New Immigration Policies and the Lives of Undocumented Latino Youth, co-author (2014)
- A Matter of Discretion: The Politics of Catholic Priests in the United States and Ireland, co-author (2017)
- Listen, We Need to Talk: How to Change Attitudes about LGBT Rights, co-author (2017)

== Selected awards ==
- Ralph J. Bunche Award, American Political Science Association, for Mobilizing inclusion (2013)
- Best Book Award, Race, Ethnicity, and Politics section of the American Political Science Association, for Mobilizing inclusion (2013)
- Jane Mansbridge Award, American Political Science Association (2016)
- Distinguished Career Award, Midwest Political Science Association (2019)
