= Lorri Houston =

American animal rights advocate

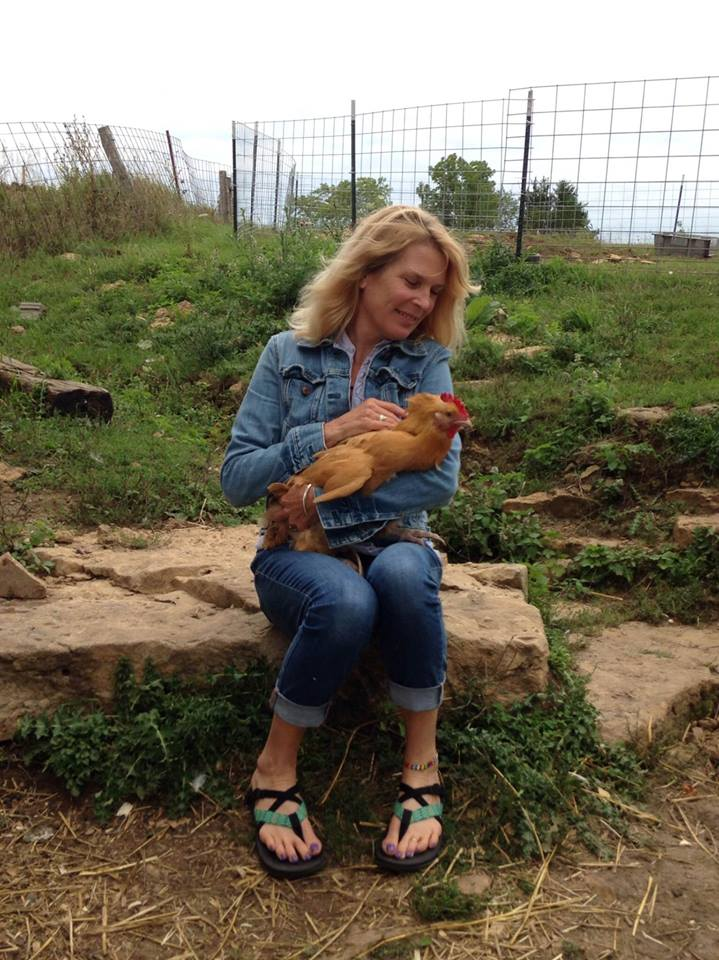
Lorri Houston holding a rescued hen

Lorri Houston (aka Lorri Bauston) co-founded the Farm Sanctuary in 1986 and founded Animal Acres in 2005.

== Personal life ==
Houston was born May 11 in Madison, Wisconsin. She attended the University of Wisconsin–Madison where she obtained a Master of Public Policy & Administration (MPA) and a Master of Social Work, Public Administration and Social Service Professions. Houston graduated 1983. While working at Greenpeace in Chicago, Houston met her now ex-husband, Gene Baur. When they married, Lorri and Gene merged their last names to become Lorri and Gene Bauston (after their divorce, they went back to their original names).

Houston is a board member of Heartland Farm Sanctuary.

== Farm Sanctuary ==
The Farm Sanctuary was the first shelter for farm animals; created to protect and advocate for the rights of farm animals against factory farming and mistreatment. While doing research and observation at a stockyard in Lancaster, Pennsylvania, Houston came across a living sheep on a pile of dead carcasses. She is now known as Hilda, and was immediately rescued by Houston and was taken to a veterinarian. It turned out that Hilda was perfectly healthy, but was discarded as a "downer" because she was unable to stand after enduring the brutal conditions of transportation from farm to factory. Unable to keep a sheep in her backyard forever, Houston started Farm Sanctuary with then-husband Gene Baur, and Hilda was their first rescued farm animal. Today, Farm Sanctuary houses over 400 rescued farm animals in three locations in the United States. Houston left Farm Sanctuary in 2004 to begin the establishment of Animal Acres in 2005.

== Animal Acres ==
Animal Acres was founded in May 2005 as an extension of Houston's work with the Farm Sanctuary. It provides a home for farm animals that have been abused, neglected, and/or mistreated. Located in Los Angeles County, California, Animal Acres also provides tours about factory farming, vegetarianism/veganism, and animal rights. Houston left Animal acres in April 2011.
