= The Humane League =

International animal nonprofit

- Formation: 2005
- Type: Non-profit
- Purpose: Animal rights, animal welfare
- Headquarters: Rockville, Maryland
- Region served: United States
- President: Vicky Bond
- Employees: 169
- Website: thehumaneleague.org

The Humane League (THL) is an international nonprofit organization that advocates for improved welfare standards for animals raised for food. Founded in 2005 in Philadelphia by Nick Cooney, the organization operates in the United States, Mexico, the United Kingdom, and Japan. Its work includes corporate engagement campaigns, public outreach, and research on animal advocacy strategies.

THL has received more than $60 million of funding from Coefficient Giving (formerly called Open Philanthropy), and has been recommended by Animal Charity Evaluators since 2012.

== History ==
The Humane League was founded in 2005 in Philadelphia by Nick Cooney. THL seeks to strengthen the animal advocacy movement. It provides grants, increases collaboration between organizations, hosts online volunteer initiatives, organizes events, and helps with recruiting and training. Since 2008, THL has been educating the public about intensive animal farming and advocating for a vegan lifestyle. THL uses social networks, online ads, media, leaflets, cookbooks and newsrack. THL also promotes the adoption by companies of the Better Chicken Commitment, which seeks to improve the welfare of broiler chicken in intensive animal farms.

In 2013, THL founded "The Humane League Labs", which evaluates the effectiveness of different animal advocacy tactics. As of 2016, The Humane League Labs is planning to conduct research on the degree to which farm animal advocacy motivates the purchase of vegan products and on the effectiveness of online vegan outreach. Vegan Publishers has criticized the methodology and reporting of previous Humane League Lab studies.

THL created in 2016 the Open Wing Alliance, a global coalition of more than 100 animal welfare organizations aiming to end the use of cages in egg production. In the following years, THL received donations from Open Philanthropy to continue to grow and sustain the Open Wing Alliance.

== Activism ==
THL had been involved in over 100 campaigns to convince global companies to pledge using only non-battery cage eggs after a certain date, including Sodexo, Mariott International, Costco, Grupo Bimbo, Starbucks, Compass Group, and Dunkin' Donuts. The Open Philanthropy Project wrote in 2015 that "Other leading organizations in corporate campaigns have consistently reported to us that THL plays a key role in these campaigns."

Following negotiations with THL, United Egg Producers—which represents companies that produce 95% of all eggs produced in the United States—announced that it will eliminate the culling of male chicks by 2020. Chick culling refers to the routine killing of male chicks (which are useless for meat or egg-laying), usually by gassing or grinding them alive. United Egg Producers continued chick culling despite this commitment, stating in 2021 that it was still searching for "an ethical, economically feasible alternative to the practice of male chick culling at hatcheries".

In 2021, THL released a report which found that "99% of U.S. store-brand chickens" were afflicted by white striping, a poultry disease that causes "elevated serum creatine kinase levels, increased fat content in pectoral muscle, gross white striations in the direction of muscle fiber, and hypertrophy of pectoral muscle which are similar to observations in hereditary muscular dystrophy".

== Cost-effectiveness and reception ==
As of April 2026, THL has been listed as a top charity by Animal Charity Evaluators since August 2012, with the most recent review in 2025. As part of that review, Animal Charity Evaluators wrote:

Our assessment of THL’s Cage-Free Accountability and Better Chicken Commitment Accountability programs indicates that they have executed their activities cost effectively to date. We estimate that their cage-free accountability work helps roughly 11 egg-laying hens per dollar, while their Better Chicken Commitment accountability work helps about 46 broiler chickens per dollar. While these figures are highly uncertain, they strengthen our confidence in the high cost effectiveness of THL’s programs.

In addition to Animal Charity Evaluators's assessment, the cost-effectiveness of THL's online vegan advocacy ads has been analyzed on LessWrong and by negative utilitarian Brian Tomasik.

Partly as a result of the Animal Charity Evaluators recommendation, THL has been viewed positively in the effective altruism movement. Raising for Effective Giving lists THL as a standout animal welfare charity. The Chronicle of Philanthropy cited an example of an effective altruist who chose to pursue a career in finance so that he could pursue earning to give, donating large sums to The Humane League to help it spend more aggressively in pursuit of its goals.

== Funding ==
Coefficient Giving (formerly called Open Philanthropy) made several grants since 2016, totaling over $60 million as of 2025. Most grants were for "general support", and some were dedicated to specific projects such as expanding the Open Wing Alliance or running cage-free campaigns.
