= Downer (animal) =

Animal, usually livestock, that cannot stand on its own and therefore is to be killed

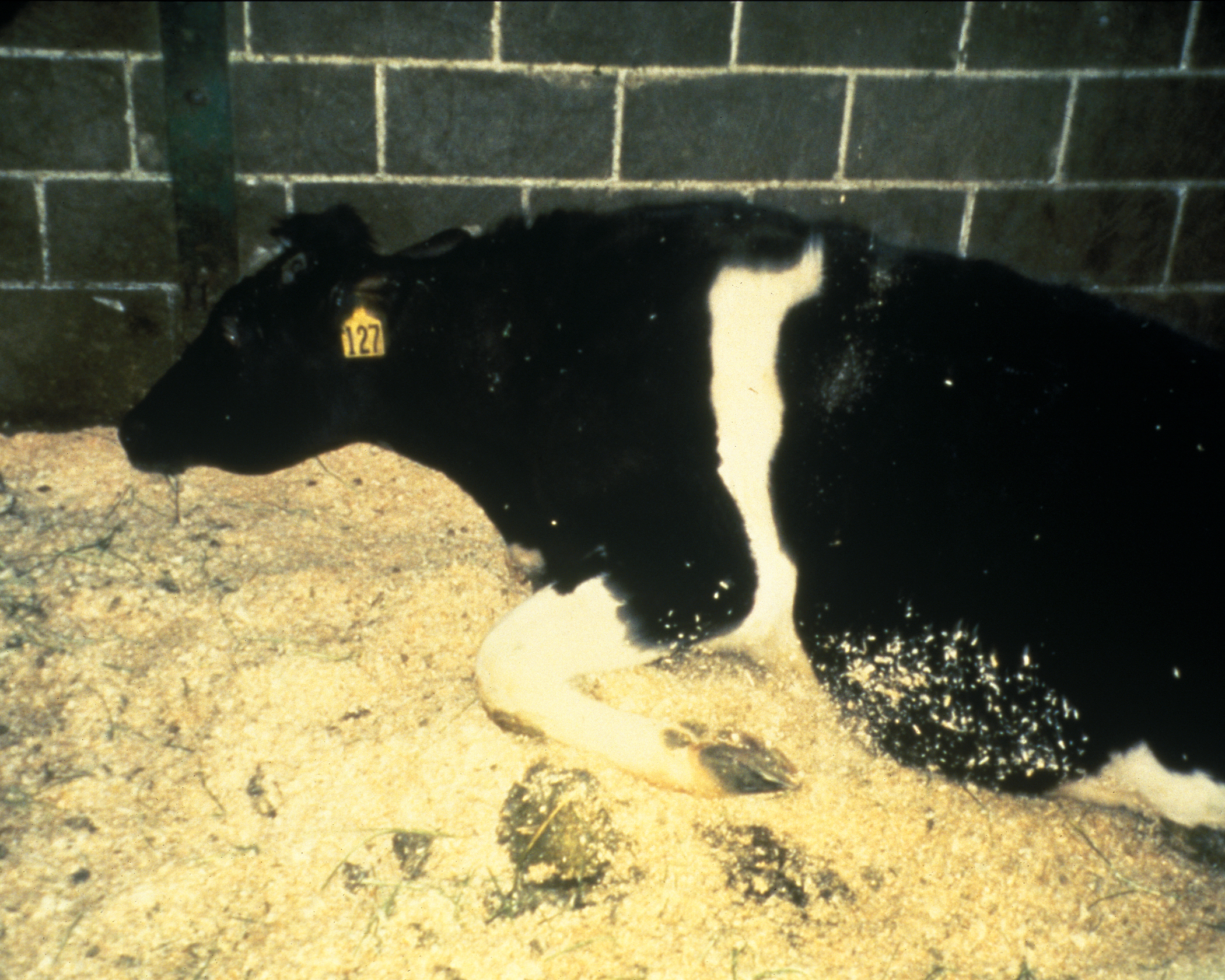
A downed animal suffering from Bovine spongiform encephalopathy

A downer is an animal, usually livestock, that cannot stand on its own and therefore is to be killed. A downed animal, one that is unable to stand, is not necessarily a downer.

== Causes ==
The animal's inability to stand may be caused by illness or injury. In nearly all cases it is considered by most farmers to be both humane and cost-effective to kill the animal when it becomes a downer, rather than keeping it alive and unhealthy. Once killed, and depending on how the animal became a downer and how it was killed, the animal may then be incinerated, buried, rendered, or slaughtered. Because of mad cow disease, the slaughter of downer cattle is a topic of great concern.

There are many possible reasons for an animal staying down, including:

- Mastitis
- Metritis
- Hypomagnesaemia
- Postparturient Hypocalcemia
- Ketosis
- Dystocia
  - Nerve damage
  - Pelvic fracture
- Long bone fracture
- Neurological disease
- Prions/Mad Cow Disease

Use of certain animal feed additives has been linked to downers such as the use of ractopamine in pigs.

== Situations in different countries ==
=== United States ===
A longstanding issue is whether these animals are treated humanely or inhumanely by shippers, stockyards, and packers while they are being moved or held for slaughter. Legislation periodically is introduced in Congress to outlaw the sale or transfer of such animals, but livestock producer groups have long contended that their voluntary efforts to end harmful practices have already proven successful. The 2002 farm bill (P.L. 107–171, Sec. 10815) required the USDA to investigate and submit a report on nonambulatory livestock, and to issue and enforce regulations, if deemed necessary, to provide for their humane treatment.

Different jurisdictions have different rules about what can be done with a downer cow. In some jurisdictions the cow may be slaughtered without question. In others, downer cattle may not be slaughtered even if the cause is a physical injury. In the United States, meat inspection is usually an interstate commerce issue, and is regulated by the Federal Meat Inspection Act. Now all livestock auction barns are not allowed to take sick or downer cows because of the rulings that originated with the BSE "mad cow" crisis.

=== Canada ===
In Canada, transportation of animals is federally regulated. The Health of Animals Regulations state that an animal has to be fit for the intended journey and that a non-ambulatory animal cannot be transported because transport would cause additional suffering.

The Canadian authority responsible for the welfare of animals that are transported is the Canadian Food Inspection Agency.

== Mad cow disease and downers ==
The downer issue took on another dimension when bovine spongiform encephalopathy (BSE), which often makes infected cattle downers, was found in two North American cows in 2003. Many experts believe that nonambulatory cattle are at higher risk of harboring BSE. As a result, on December 30, 2003, the USDA announced an immediate ban on the slaughter of downer cattle for human food use. At issue is how to monitor the hundreds of thousands of U.S. downer cattle (annual estimate) if they are no longer presented for observation and testing at meat packing plants; also at issue is what to do with their remains, and whether they have any non-food value.

== See also ==
- Becky Sandstedt
- Transmissible mink encephalopathy
