= Mercy for Animals =

United States-based animal welfare organization

Mercy For Animals
- Abbreviation: MFA
- Formation: 1999
- Type: Non-profit
- Region served: United States, Canada, Brazil, Latin America, India, Asia
- President: Leah Garcés
- Website: mercyforanimals.org

Mercy For Animals (MFA) is an international nonprofit animal protection organization founded in 1999 by Milo Runkle. MFA's mission is to "prevent cruelty to farmed animals and promote compassionate food choices and policies."

== History ==
=== 1999–2007: Founding and early days ===
Milo Runkle wrote in Mercy For Animals: One Man's Quest to Inspire Compassion and Improve the Lives of Farm Animals, published in 2017, that he founded MFA after a biology teacher at his rural Ohio high school brought dead piglets to class to be dissected. One piglet was still alive, so a student who worked on the teacher's farm grabbed the piglet and slammed her headfirst against the floor. The incident was controversial in the community, yet a judge ruled that the student's action was legal because it was "standard agricultural practice".

Milo wrote that the injustice weighed heavily on him and led him to create an organization with a mission to protect farmed animals.

MFA conducted its first investigations in 2001. Investigators entered two Ohio egg factory farms at night five times over several weeks. They collected hours of video footage, gave water to dehydrated hens, and rescued other suffering birds.

These open rescues made headlines around the state. Ohio's largest television news station at the time aired the footage, promoting the segment as "The Video the Egg Industry Doesn't Want You to See".

In 2002, MFA investigators recorded footage from inside another Ohio factory farm, Weaver Bros. Egg Farm. About five hours of video showed thousands of hens in cages, birds trapped between cage wire unable to access food or water, and dead animals rotting next to other birds still laying eggs for human consumption. MFA used the footage to discredit a new Animal Care Certified label which advertised that hens were raised humanely.

MFA asked prosecutors to investigate and file charges against these farms, but no charges were filed.

=== 2008–2010: Undercover investigations and state legislation ===
Current MFA investigators obtain employment at factory farms and slaughterhouses to document conditions. Being in the facilities for extended periods of time allows the investigators to record repeated abuse and make a case for systemic and ongoing cruelty, which can spur animal cruelty convictions, corporate animal welfare policies, and new legislation.

In 2008, animal rights advocates organized a grassroots campaign across California to pass Proposition 2, a state ballot initiative requiring that egg-laying hens, pregnant pigs, and calves raised for veal be given enough room to lie down, stand up, fully extend their limbs, and turn around. MFA released investigative footage from inside two of California's largest egg farms, Gemperle Enterprises and Norco Ranch, just two weeks before the vote. Prop 2 was passed. It is still considered one of the most significant pieces of farmed animal protection legislation ever enacted in the United States.

A year later, MFA investigators in Maine uncovered workers and managers at an egg factory farm killing birds by grabbing them by the neck and swinging them in the air. MFA turned the video footage over to state police, who in turn raided the facility. The facility owner pled guilty to 10 counts of animal cruelty and agreed to pay more than $130,000 in fines and restitution, the largest financial penalty ever levied against a U.S. factory farm.

In 2010, several organizations, including MFA, launched a campaign to enact legislation in Ohio that would protect farmed animals. The Ohio Farm Bureau refused to meet with the coalition until an MFA investigation at an Ohio dairy farm showed workers stabbing cows with pitchforks, beating them with crowbars, and twisting their tails until the bones snapped. After the investigation's release, the Ohio Farm Bureau finally agreed to meet with the groups and enacted farmed animal welfare reforms.

=== 2011–2013: Exposés in Canada, corporate campaigns, and cruelty convictions ===
Propelled by progress in the United States, MFA expanded to Canada in 2012. MFA's first exposé of the Canadian pork industry prompted the country's eight largest grocers to phase gestation crates out of their supply chains. A whistleblower documented workers firing metal bolts into pigs' heads - leaving many pigs unconscious for minutes - and cutting off piglets' testicles without painkillers. Some workers slammed piglets headfirst into the ground to kill them. Pregnant pigs were kept in crates so small the animals could not turn around. Canada's popular W5 news program aired the footage nationwide.

Canada's pork industry also committed to a national phaseout of gestation crates, and pork producers agreed to stop mutilating piglets without pain relief.

Footage taken by MFA at two Alberta suppliers to Burnbrae Farms, at the time an egg supplier to McDonald's Canada, prompted nearly 120,000 Canadians to call on McDonald's to ban cages for egg-laying hens in the company's supply chain. Following the exposé and public outcry, McDonald's announced a policy to eliminate cages for hens from its North American supplier farms. Nearly the entire Canadian food industry followed suit.

In the U.S., MFA conducted investigations inside turkey factory farms supplying Butterball. Media outlets CNN, the Associated Press, NBC, and USA Today reported on the investigations, which revealed workers violently stomping on turkeys, dragging them by their wings and necks, slamming them into transport crates, and leaving many to suffer from untreated injuries and infections. Prompted by hidden-camera footage, law enforcement in North Carolina conducted a two-day raid at one of the facilities. Five Butterball employees were arrested and charged with criminal cruelty to animals. The prosecutions led to the first-ever felony conviction for cruelty to factory-farmed poultry in U.S. history.

The following year, MFA investigated a dairy factory farm in Wisconsin that supplied Nestlé's DiGiorno Pizza brand. Undercover footage revealed cows beaten, stabbed, and dragged by tractors. After the video received widespread media attention, Nestlé, the largest food company in the world, met with MFA and implemented a far-reaching animal welfare policy.

=== 2014–2016: Campaigns; new initiatives; and expansion to Brazil, Mexico, India, and Asia ===
Following progress with Nestlé, MFA targeted Leprino Foods, Great Lakes Cheese, and Saputo. After MFA investigations uncovered abuse in each of their supply chains, the companies released their own animal welfare policies.

After six MFA investigations into Walmart's pork supply chain, three years of campaigning, and pressure from Bob Barker, James Cromwell, Ryan Gosling, and a slew of other celebrities, in May 2015 Walmart banned gestation crates, battery cages, and veal crates from its U.S. supply chains. The retail giant also pledged to end mutilations without painkillers, such as tail docking, castration, and dehorning.

Following MFA's exposés and campaigns, top U.S. grocers Publix, Kroger, Albertsons, and SUPERVALU, along with the Retail Council of Canada, also pledged to ban intensive confinement of hens from their egg supply chains.

In early 2016, MFA launched The Good Food Institute. The organization's mission is to create "a healthy, humane, and sustainable food supply." The Good Food Institute provides strategic support to companies, promotes plant-based products, supports entrepreneurs, and educates grant-making institutions, corporations, and governmental bodies about plant-based and clean meat.

In June 2016, Perdue, one of the largest chicken producers in the world, announced a precedent-setting commitment to improving animal welfare after MFA investigated two contract farms in the U.S. supplying the company. The policy was to reduce suffering for nearly 680 million birds annually.

In the same year, MFA also set up operations in Brazil, Mexico, India, and Asia. An MFA investigator recorded footage from inside nine government-run slaughterhouses in Mexico. Pigs were dragged by their limbs to the killing floor and stabbed repeatedly. A tied-up cow suffered blows from a sledgehammer. A cornered pig was stabbed in the side with a large knife. The investigation drew attention from major Mexican media outlets Reforma, El Universal, and Proceso.

Mexican actor Eugenio Derbez narrated an MFA video about the cruelty. In an online petition, Eugenio wrote, "I watched the video in horror as animals were tied up, shocked for no reason, brutally and repeatedly bludgeoned with sledgehammers, and then stabbed in the back of the head."

Back in the U.S., MFA was also part of a coalition of organizations that worked to pass the Prevention of Farm Animal Cruelty Act in Massachusetts. The measure, passed in 2016, outlaws some of the cruelest farming practices and bans the sale of eggs, pork, and veal from animals raised in intensive confinement.

=== 2017–2019 ===
After the 2016 investigations, MFA worked with members of Mexico's congress to introduce federal legislation that would end the worst slaughter methods shown in the undercover video. The bill passed through two committees and the representative branch of Mexico's congress, with nearly unanimous support. As of October 2018, the bill was waiting on a senate vote.

In 2016, the then Executive VP Nick Cooney was accused of harassment and bullying as part of #MeToo; he left the organization the following year. MFA publicized several actions in response to the accusations.

MFA has conducted multiple exposés inside factory farms in Brazil.

In 2018, MFA staff in Brazil helped secure a historic commitment from Carrefour, the largest supermarket in Brazil, to eliminating small cages for hens. After MFA campaigns or discussions with MFA, dozens of other major brands in the U.S., Canada, Mexico, and Brazil, including Burger King, General Mills, Jack in the Box, Pollo Pepe, Les Croissants, Loz Car, Grupo Alimentos Vitales de México, Habib's, and Grupo Halipar (Brazil) pledged to change how they treat animals.

In recent years, MFA has also pioneered investigations of factory farms and slaughterhouses using unmanned aerial vehicles. MFA drones have exposed 35 factory farms, and views of the investigative videos have surpassed 22 million.

A 2018 undercover investigation into California's driftnet fishing industry showed dolphins entangled and drowned in driftnets, endangered species killed, and sharks cut apart and stabbed while still alive and conscious. Undercover footage influenced federal legislation aimed at banning driftnets.

=== 2020s ===
A 2020 investigation focusing on the live export industry in Brazil revealed animals being confined in large ships in cramped conditions for weeks on end, often lying in and covered in their own feces. After arriving at their destination in the Middle East, cranes are used to hoist sick and injured animals out by their limbs. At the slaughterhouses, they are often slashed with knives and left to bleed to death, limbs are hacked off and throats stabbed.

In 2023, the organization was given a B+ rating for financial management.

MFA celebrated their 25th anniversary with a gala held on April 20, 2024. They gave several awards out on the night, including one to Beyond Meat and one to Gwenna Hunter, who opened the first vegan foodbank in Los Angeles.

In August 2024, the organization helped to secure a commitment on shrimp welfare from UK supermarket chain Tesco.

== Transfarmation ==
In 2019, Leah Garcés founded Transfarmation to support farmers to transition from concentrated animal feeding operations to plant-focused farms. In August 2024, a hog farming family from Iowa transitioning to mushroom farming was featured in the NYT.

In 2024, Garcés published a book on Transfarmation, entitled Transfarmation: the Movement to Free Us from Factory Farming. This was a sequel to her 2019 book, Grilled.

== See also ==
- List of animal rights groups
