= Commodity status of animals =

Legal status as property of most non-human animals

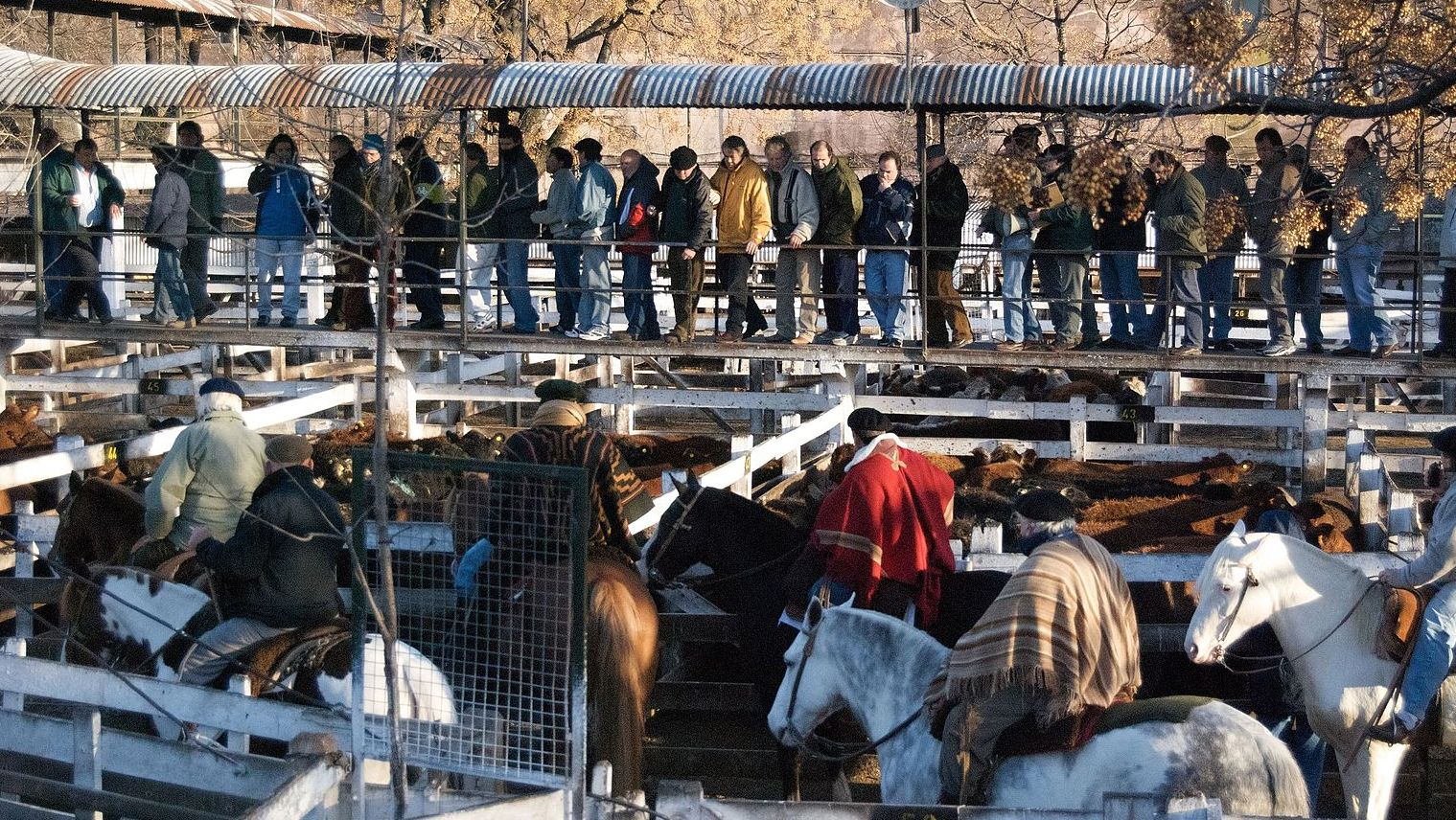
Liniers cattle market, Buenos Aires, Argentina, 2009.

The commodity status of animals is the legal status as property of most non-human animals, particularly farmed animals, working animals and animals in sport, and their use as objects of trade. (Note: David N. Cassuto (Professor of Law, Pace Law School), 2009: "These [farmer–animal] relationships did not necessarily maximize yield but were rather based on a set of normative guidelines even as the ultimate reality of the animals' commodity status inevitably imbued that bond with a sense of unreality." Samantha Hillyard (Reader in Sociology, Durham University), 2007: "The construction of FMD (foot-and-mouth disease) as an 'economic' disease (a disease that is controlled for economic and financial reasons, rather than purely animal health or welfare concerns) recognised animals' commodity status.") In the United States, free-roaming animals (ferae naturae) are (broadly) held in trust by the state; only if captured can they be claimed as personal property. (Note: Prohibitions may exist in the US, however, against the capture of endangered species)

Animals regarded as commodities may be bought, sold, given away, bequeathed, killed, and used as commodity producers: producers of meat, eggs, milk, fur, wool, skin and offspring, among other things. The exchange value of the animal does not depend on the quality of life.

The commodity status of livestock is evident in auction yards, where they are tagged with a barcode and traded according to certain qualities, including age, weight, sex and breeding history. (Note: Rosemary-Claire Collard, Kathryn Gillespie, 2015: "Nonhuman animals are subjected to various modes of bodily control in the space of the auction yard where they are exchanged as commodities and used in the production of new commodities. ... Farmed animals, like the cow with barcode #743, are sold and bought at auction to be used as commodity producers (e.g. for breeding, milk production, semen production) and as commodities themselves (e.g. to be slaughtered for 'meat').") In commodity markets, animals and animal products are classified as soft commodities, along with goods such as coffee and sugar, because they are grown, as opposed to hard commodities, such as gold and copper, which are mined. (Note: The United States Commodity Exchange Act, which regulates commodity futures trading, defines commodities as "wheat, cotton, rice, corn, oats, barley, rye, flaxseed, grain sorghums, mill feeds, butter, eggs, Solanum tuberosum (Irish potatoes), wool, wool tops, fats and oils (including lard, tallow, cottonseed oil, peanut oil, soybean oil, and all other fats and oils), cottonseed meal, cottonseed, peanuts, soybeans, soybean meal, livestock, livestock products, and frozen concentrated orange juice, and all other goods and articles, except onions (as provided by section 13–1 of this title) and motion picture box office receipts (or any index, measure, value, or data related to such receipts), and all services, rights, and interests (except motion picture box office receipts, or any index, measure, value or data related to such receipts) in which contracts for future delivery are presently or in the future dealt in.")

Researchers identify viewing animals as commodities by humans as a manifestation of speciesism. The vegan and animal rights movements, chiefly the abolitionist approach, of the twentieth century call for eliminating the commodity or property status of animals.

== History and law ==
Animals, when owned, are classified as personal property (movable property not attached to real property/real estate). (Note: The four categories of property are personal property (movables, chattels), real property (land and fixtures), intellectual property (such as copyrights), and cultural property (such as national monuments).) The word cattle derives from the French word cheptel or Old French word chatel, or personal property.

Historian Joyce E. Salisbury writes that the relationship between humans and animals was always expressed in terms of control, and the idea that animals become property by being domesticated. She notes that Saint Ambrose (340–397) held the view that God controlled wild animals while humanity controlled the rest. Isidore of Seville (560–636) distinguished between "cattle", a term for animals that had been domesticated, and "beasts" or wild animals, as did Thomas Aquinas (1225–1274).

The English jurist William Blackstone (1723–1780) wrote of domesticated animals, in Commentaries on the Laws of England (1765–1769):

In such as are of a nature tame and domestic (as horses, kine [cows], sheep, poultry, and the like), a man may have as absolute a property as in any inanimate beings ... because these continue perpetually in his occupation, and will not stray from his house or person, unless by accident or fraudulent entitlement, in either of which cases the owner does not lose his property ...

That wild animals belong in common to everyone, or to the state, and can become personal property only if captured, is known as the "animals ferae naturae" doctrine. Blackstone wrote of wild animals that they are either "not the objects of property at all, or else fall under our other division, namely, that of qualified, limited, or special property, which is such as is not in its nature permanent, but may sometimes subsist, and at other times not subsist."

== Commodification ==
The commodification of animals is one of the earliest forms of commodification, which can be traced back to the time when domestication of animals began. It includes the use of animals in all forms, including use of animals for food, medicine, fashion and cosmetics, medical research, labor and transport, entertainment, wildlife trade, companionship, and so forth. Scholars say that the commodification of nonhuman animals in food systems is directly linked to capitalist systems that prioritize "monopolistically inclined financial interests" over the well-being of humans, nonhumans, and the environment. Over 200 billion land and aquatic animals are killed every year to provide humans with animal products for consumption, which many scholars and activists have described as an "animal holocaust". The extensive use of land and other resources for the production of meat instead of grain for human consumption is a leading cause of malnutrition, hunger, and famine around the world.

== Sentience ==
Writing about wild animals being imported into France in the 18th century, historian Louise Robbins writes that a "cultural biography of things" would show animals "sliding in and out of commodity status and taking on different values for different people" as they make their way from their homes to the streets of Paris. Sociologist Rhoda Wilkie has used the term "sentient commodity" to describe this view of how the conception of animals as commodities can shift depending on whether a human being forms a relationship with them. Geographers Rosemary-Claire Collard and Jessica Dempsey use the term "lively commodities".

Political scientist Sami Torssonen argues that animal welfare has itself been commodified since the 1990s because of public concern for animals. "Scientifically-certified welfare products", which Torssonen calls "sellfare", are "producible and salable at various points in the commodity chain", subject to competition like any other commodity. Social scientist Jacy Reese Anthis argues that, while there is no immanent right for animals or humans to not be commodified, there are strong practical reasons to oppose any commodification of animals, not just that which is cruel or egregious.

Commodification of nonhuman animals is one of the primary impacts of the animal–industrial complex. In the book Education for Total Liberation, Meneka Repka cites Barbara Noske as saying that the commodification of nonhuman animals in food systems is directly linked to capitalist systems that prioritize "monopolistically inclined financial interests" over the well-being of humans, nonhumans, and the environment. Richard Twine furthers this stating that "corporate influences have had a direct interest through marketing, advertising, and flavour manipulation in constructing the consumption of animal products as a sensual material pleasure."

== See also ==
- Animal exploitation
- Animal–industrial complex
- Animal rights
- Commodification
- Intensive animal farming
- Live export
- Livestock
- Meat Atlas
- Keeble v Hickeringill
- Pierson v. Post
- Ratione soli
- Veganism
