= Animal exploitation =

Human utilization of non-human animals

Animal exploitation is the human utilization of non-human animals, typically for ther human's personal and economic benefit or resource extraction from the latter, including meat, hide, bodily secretions, organs, labor, and so forth, without regards for their well-being, which often results in suffering and harm on the animal's part and/or confinement and deprivation of the animal's natural living conditions. It occurs across various animal industries and involves different practices, treating non-human animals as commodities rather than sentient beings and violating their rights. According to the Humane League, animal exploitation lies at the opposite end of the spectrum from animal rights, "which are situations in which animals have no choice to live freely, no autonomy over their own lives. Instead, humans dictate every aspect of an exploited animal's life." The institutionalized form of animal exploitation is referred to as the animal industrial complex (AIC).

Along with meat consumption, animal exploitation is considered part of the dominant ideological system called carnism, which prescribes norms and beliefs about animal treatment. According to some scholars, both exploitation of animals and consumption of meat represent underlying competitive-power motives of domination over animals and support for inequality between humans and nonhuman animals.

== Domains of exploitation ==
Animal exploitation occurs across industries ranging from agriculture, where animals are treated as commodities to be turned into food, to science, where they are treated as unwilling test subjects. The exploitation manifests itself in all forms, including use of animals for food, medicine, fashion and cosmetics, medical research, labor and transport, entertainment, wildlife trade, companionship, and so forth. Animal rights are also violated when their habitats are destroyed often to make room for more farm lands and human habitat expansion. According to Brian Luke, the primary way we relate to nonhuman animals is in terms of their purpose for us, that is, how useful they are to us, based on which we construct institutions to carry out those uses, resulting in institutionalized animal exploitation.

While industrialization of animal exploitation does not represent the entirety of human use of animals, the animal–industrial complex remains the place where most of the animal exploitation takes place today. The animal–industrial complex is the systematic and institutionalized exploitation of animals, which scholars claim differ from individual acts of animal cruelty. The animal–industrial complex involves commodification of animals under contemporary capitalism and includes every economic activity involving animals, such as food, animal research, entertainment, fashion, companionship, and so forth, all of which are seen as consequences of animal exploitations. The animal–industrial complex is accused of involvement in a range of perceived wrongs, including animal agribusiness and its networks, or the agro-industrial complex (which includes animal agriculture, the meat and dairy industries, factory farms, poultry, apiculture, aquaculture, and the like), intersecting with various other industrial complexes, such as the pharmaceutical–industrial complex, medical–industrial complex, vivisection–industrial complex, cosmetic–industrial complex, entertainment–industrial complex, academic–industrial complex, security–industrial complex, prison–industrial complex, and so forth, all of which involve exploitation of animals. Philosopher Steven Best believes that all these industrial complexes interrelate with and reinforce the animal–industrial complex by "exploiting the nonhuman animal slaves" of the latter.

== Standard defenses ==
Luke categorizes the standard defenses of animal use into three broad categories, namely, those that refer to human rationality, those that claim divine sanction, and those that describe exploitation as natural. Rationalistic arguments are based on human superiority (e.g., "Human lives are intrinsically more valuable than animal lives"), reciprocation (e.g., "We only have moral duties to those who can reciprocate"), and replacement (e.g., "Some animal would not exist if we did not exploit them"). Factors behind theistic arguments include human sanctity (e.g., "We were created in God's image"), sacrifice (e.g., "God requires us to make blood offerings"), and creation (e.g., "God created animals for our use"). Naturalistic arguments include human chauvinism (e.g., "Our contempt for other species is natural"), predatory instinct (e.g., "Men are hunters by nature"), and competition (e.g., "It is natural for species to exploit each other").

Theories such as social dominance theory (SDT) are used by researchers as frameworks for understanding human attitudes towards the use of animals. Researchers identify viewing animals as commodities by humans as a manifestation of speciesism. Studies demonstrate that ethnic prejudices such as racism are positively associated with speciesism. According to scholars, the most willingness to exploit non-human animals is found in people who express greater ethnic prejudice. This effect is underpinned by the role of social dominance orientation linking these distinct forms of bias.

== Consequences ==
Animal exploitation, particularly in food production and research, has two important consequences: (a) the animals may suffer pain, discomfort, malady, and isolation and may live short lives; and (b) these activities cause large numbers of animals to be brought into existence.

Animal exploitation has several negative consequences, including those for humans, which is exemplified by factory farming. According to the Humane Society of the United States, animal exploitation also has negative societal moral consequences. Some scholars identify the denial of the moral status of non-human animals as a model for human slavery, genocide, and exploitation of women. According to Brian Luke, animal exploitation and certain gendered norms in our consciouness are deeply intertwined.

Research supports the idea that attitudes toward animals, including their rights and treatment, relate to other wider social and ideological views, including perceiving vegetarianism as a threat to traditional values. According to Branković, attitudes toward animals correlated with endorsement of social hierarchies and valuing ethnic ingroup superiority. Scholars say animal exploitation serves as a model for human exploitation. David Nibert argues that throughout history the oppression of exploited animals supported the oppression and exploitation of humans, and vice versa. The resulting change from one form of the control of state power to another, such as the older aristocracy being replaced by rising capitalism, was "every bit as violent and oppressive" as the former. The state-supported profit-driven capitalist expansion, for instance, was responsible for the killing and displacement of North America's indigenous peoples and animals. The creation of ranching operations led to intrusions onto Native American lands and violent displacement of the people in them in order to accommodate the growing numbers of oppressed animals, which in turn resulted in the creation of slaughterhouse operations.

== Prevalence ==
Studies show that the prevalence of meat consumption and animal exploitation is more among right-wing adherents. Researchers cite two main reasons for this: (a) pushing back against the supposed threat from vegetarianism and veganism to traditions and cultural practice, and (b) feeling more entitled to consume animals given human "superiority". Studies also reveal that, compared to men, women tend to be more concerned about animal welfare and less likely to support animal exploitation. Research suggest that shared psychological mechanisms can be the underlying reason for the propensities toward exploitation of natural environment and human/nonhuman animals.

== Opposition to exploitation ==
Philosophers have questioned the ethical validity of animal exploitation since the ancient times, which gave rise to vegetarianism and, at least since the second millennium CE, to veganism. Throughout history, there have been ferocious debates surrounding the utility of using animals. According to Robert Garner, the debate against animal exploitation is not simply structured around the viability of according to animals sufficiently high moral status that makes certain, or all, human uses ethically illegitimate irrespective of its consequences to humans. Rather, it questions the very necessity of exploiting animals, either on the grounds that their use does not produce the benefits claimed for it and that the use is unnecessary and trivial. The vegan and animal rights movements, chiefly the abolitionist approach, of the twentieth century call for the abolition of animal exploitation by eliminating the commodity or property status of nonhuman animals.

== See also ==
- Commodity status of animals
- Commodification
