= Animal–industrial complex =

Systematic, institutionalized exploitation of animals

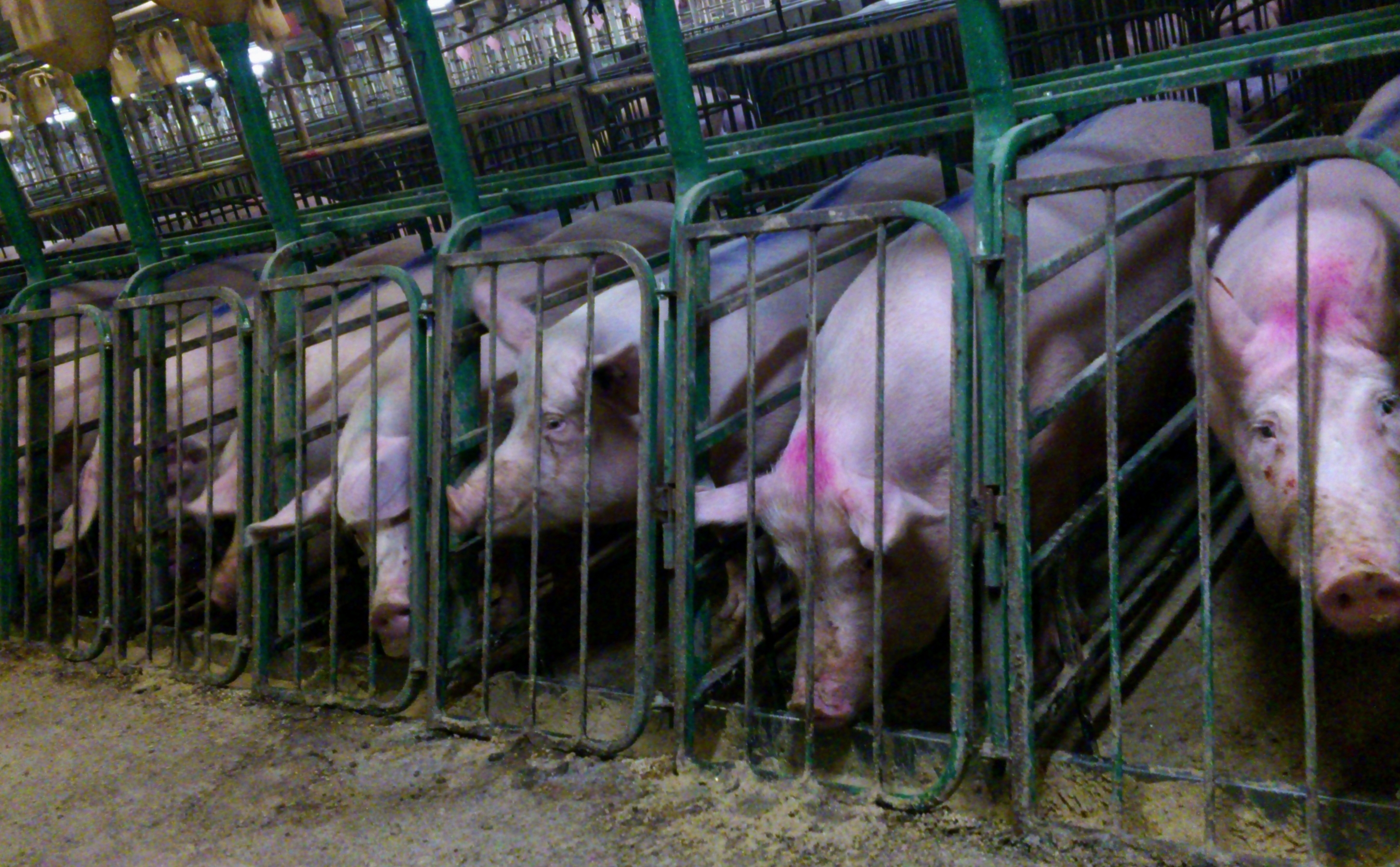
Pigs confined in gestation crates, which scholars such as Barbara Noske state is part of the animal–industrial complex. According to Noske, animals "have become reduced to mere appendages of computers and machines."

Animal–industrial complex (AIC) is a concept used by animal rights activists and scholars to describe what they contend is the systematic and institutionalized exploitation of animals. The term was adapted from the "Military-industrial complex" outlined by U.S. President Dwight D. Eisenhower in 1961. Proponents of the term claim that activities described by the term differ from individual acts of animal cruelty in that they constitute institutionalized animal exploitation.

AIC is argued to include every economic activity involving animals, such as the food industry (e.g., meat, dairy, poultry, apiculture), animal testing (e.g., academic, industrial, animals in space), medicine (e.g., bile and other animal products), clothing (e.g., leather, silk, wool, fur), labor and transport (e.g., working animals, animals in war, remote control animals), tourism and entertainment (e.g., circus, zoos, blood sports, trophy hunting, animals held in captivity), selective breeding (e.g., pet industry, artificial insemination), and so forth.

Killing more than 200 billion land and aquatic animals every year, the AIC has been implicated in climate change, ocean acidification, biodiversity loss, the Holocene extinction, and the spreading of diseases from animals to humans, including the COVID-19 pandemic.

== Definitions ==
The expression animal–industrial complex was coined by the Dutch cultural anthropologist and philosopher Barbara Noske in her 1989 book Humans and Other Animals, saying that animals "have become reduced to mere appendages of computers and machines." The expression relates the practices, organizations, and overall industry that turns animals into food and other commodities to the military–industrial complex.

Richard Twine later refined the concept, regarding it as the "partly opaque and multiple set of networks and relationships between the corporate (agricultural) sector, governments, and public and private science. With economic, cultural, social and affective dimensions it encompasses an extensive range of practices, technologies, images, identities and markets." Twine also discusses the overlap between the AIC and other industrial complexes, such as the prison–industrial complex, entertainment–industrial complex, and pharmaceutical–industrial complex. Sociologist David Nibert defines the animal–industrial complex as "a massive network that includes grain producers, ranching operations, slaughterhouse and packaging firms, fast food and chain restaurants, and the state, which he claims "has deep roots in world history."

According to Twine, the AIC essentially refers to the triple helix of influential, powerful systems that control knowledge systems about meat production, namely, the government, the corporate sphere, and the academy.

== Origin and properties ==
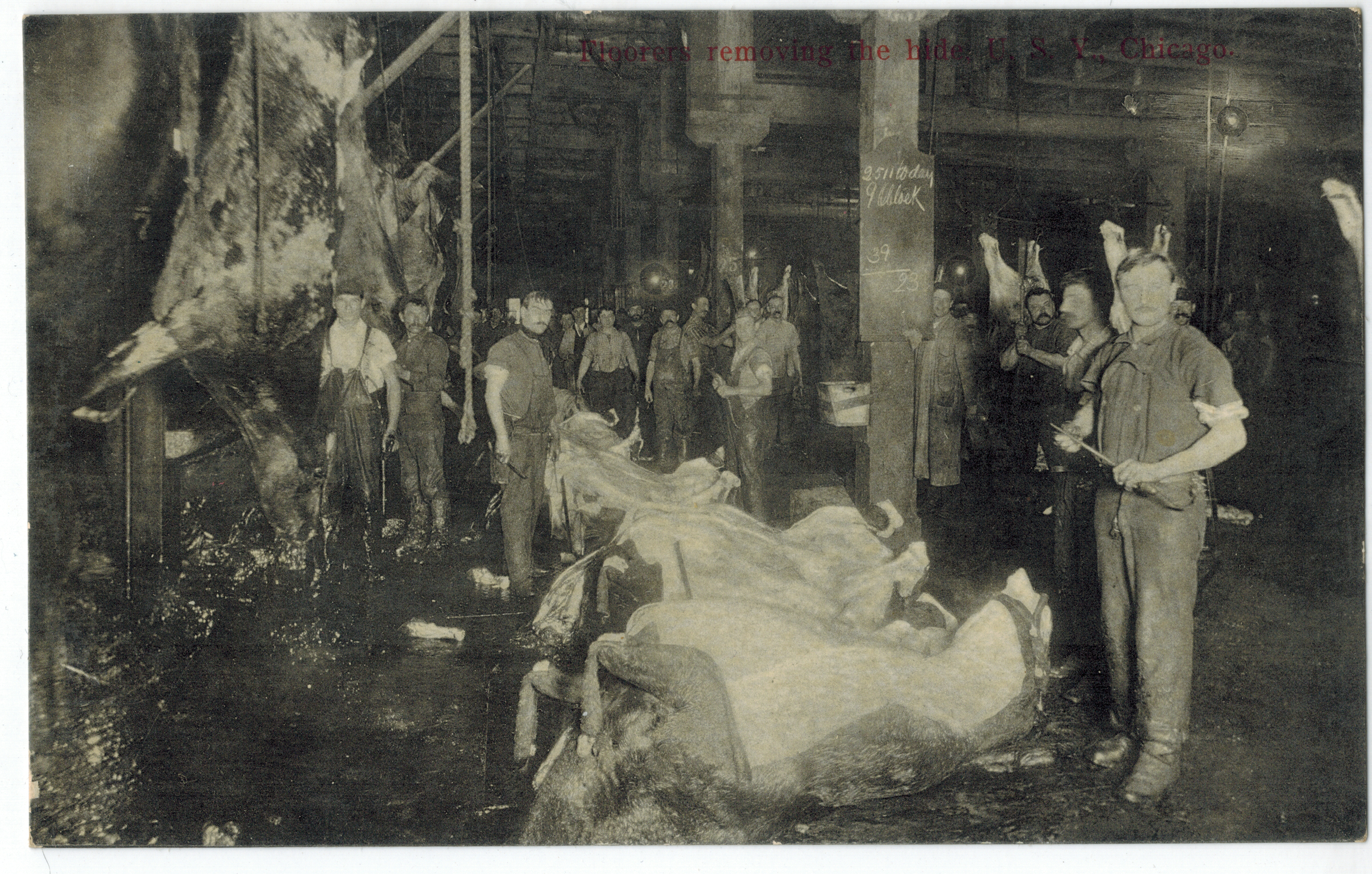
Workers and slaughtered animals in the Union Stockyards in Chicago circa 1910

Although Nibert states the origin of the animal–industrial complex can be traced back to the time when domestication of animals began, Sorenson proposes that it was only since 1945 that the complex began to grow significantly under contemporary capitalism. Kim Stallwood says that the animal–industrial complex is "an integral part of the neoliberal, transnational order of increasing privatization and decreasing government intervention, favouring transnational corporations and global capital." According to Stallwood, two milestones mark the shift in human attitudes toward animals that empowered the animal–industrial complex, namely, Chicago and its stockyards and slaughterhouses from 1865 and the post–World War II developments such as intensive factory farms, industrial fishing, and xenotransplantation. In the words of Nibert, the Chicago slaughterhouses were significant economic powers of the early 20th century and were "famous for the cruel, rapid-paced killing and disassembly of enormous numbers of animals." To elucidate animal–industrial complex, Stallwood cites Upton Sinclair's 1906 novel The Jungle, which explicitly describes the mistreatment of animals during their lives until they end up at the slaughterhouse. He also quotes Charles Patterson's Eternal Treblinka, which compares treatment of animals with the Holocaust and explains how the disassembly of animals in the slaughterhouses inspired Henry Ford's assembling of cars in factories and how it further influenced Nazi Germany in building concentration camps and gas chambers.

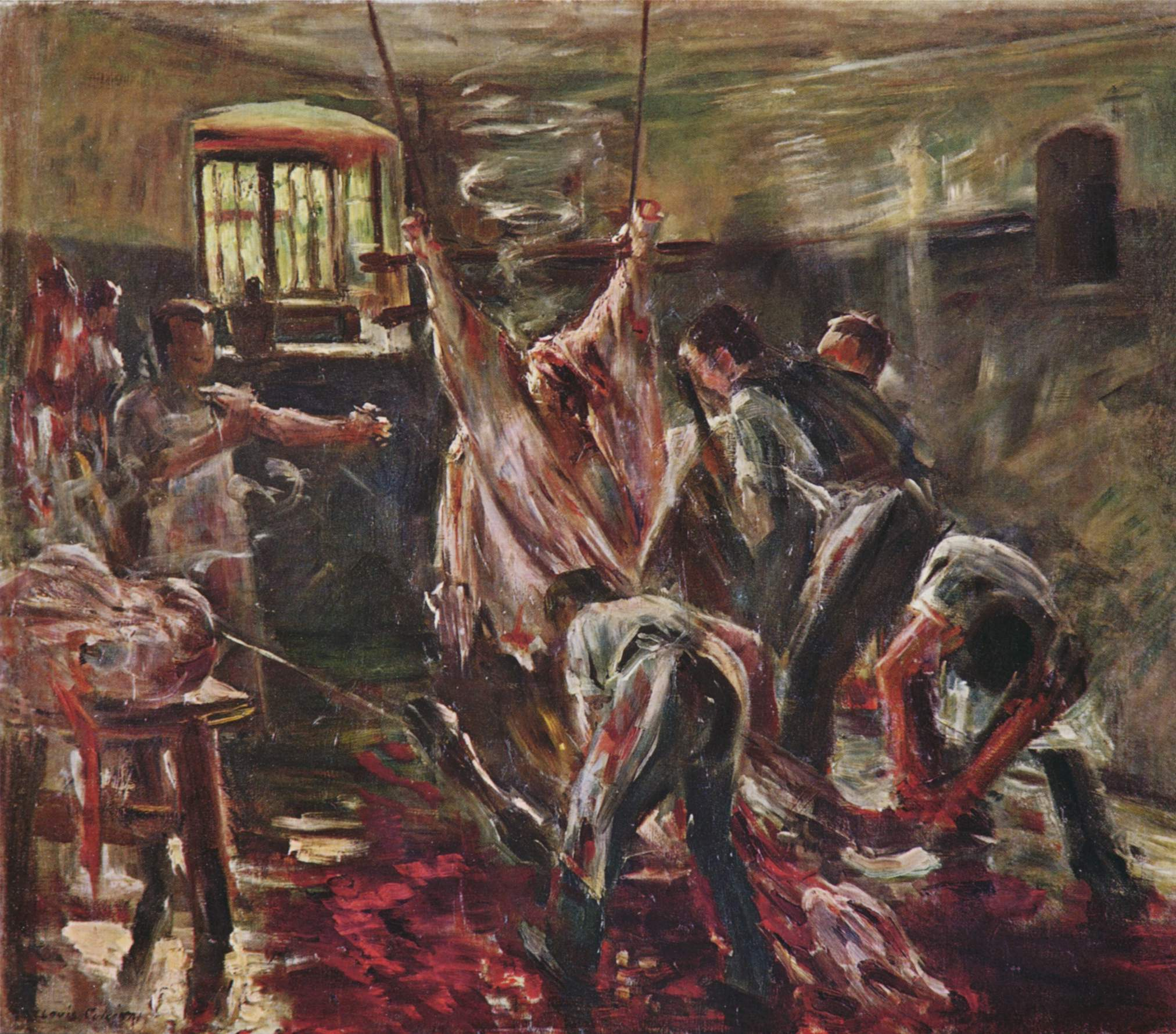
In the slaughterhouse, Lovis Corinth, 1893

According to Stallwood, the animal–industrial complex breeds animals in the billions in order to make products and services for human consumption, and all these animals are considered legal property of the animal–industrial complex. The animal–industrial complex is said to have transformed the already confused relationship between human and non-human animals, significantly increasing the consumption and threatening human survival, and the pervasive nature of the animal–industrial complex is such that it evades attention.

Nibert argues that while it has its origins in the use of animals during the establishment of agricultural societies, the animal–industrial complex is ultimately "a predictable, insidious outgrowth of the capitalist system with its penchant for continuous expansion". According to Nibert, this complex is so destructive in its pursuit of resources such as land and water to rear all of these animals as a source of profit that it warrants comparisons to Attila the Hun. As the human population grows to a projected 9 billion by the middle of the century, meat production is expected to increase by 40%. Nibert further states:

The profound cultural devaluation of other animals that permits the violence that underlies the animal industrial complex is produced by far-reaching speciesist socialization. For instance, the system of primary and secondary education under the capitalist system largely indoctrinates young people into the dominant societal beliefs and values, including a great deal of procapitalist and speciesist ideology. The devalued status of other animals is deeply ingrained; animals appear in schools merely as caged "pets," as dissection and vivisection subjects, and as lunch. On television and in movies, the unworthiness of other animals is evidenced by their virtual invisibility; when they do appear, they generally are marginalized, vilified, or objectified. Not surprisingly, these and numerous other sources of speciesism are so ideologically profound that those who raise compelling moral objections to animal oppression largely are dismissed, if not ridiculed.

Contributors to the 2013 book Animals and War, which linked critical animal studies and critical peace studies, explored the connections between the animal–industrial complex and the military–industrial complex, proposing and analysing the idea of a military-animal industrial complex. The exploitation of animals, argues Colin Salter, is not necessary to military–industrial complexes, but it is a foundational and central element of the military–industrial complex as it actually exists. One of the aims of the book as a whole was to argue for the abolition of the military-animal industrial complex and all wars.

=== Relationship with speciesism ===
Piers Beirne considers speciesism as the ideological anchor of the intersecting networks of the animal–industrial complex, such as factory farms, vivisection, hunting and fishing, zoos and aquaria, wildlife trade, and so forth. Amy J. Fitzgerald and Nik Taylor argue that the animal–industrial complex is both a consequence and cause of speciesism, which according to them is a form of discrimination similar to racism or sexism. They also argue that the obfuscation of meat's animal origins is a critical part of the animal–industrial complex under capitalist and neoliberal regimes. Speciesism results in the belief that humans have the right to use non-human animals, which is so pervasive in the modern society.

Lees and Nodding argue that all kinds of animal production is rooted in speciesism, reducing animals to mere economic resources. Built on the production and slaughter of animals, the animal–industrial complex is perceived as the materialization of the institution of speciesism, with speciesism becoming "a mode of production." In his 2011 book Critical Theory and Animal Liberation, John Sanbonmatsu argues that speciesism is not ignorance or the absence of a moral code towards animals, but is a mode of production and material system imbricated with capitalism.

== Components ==
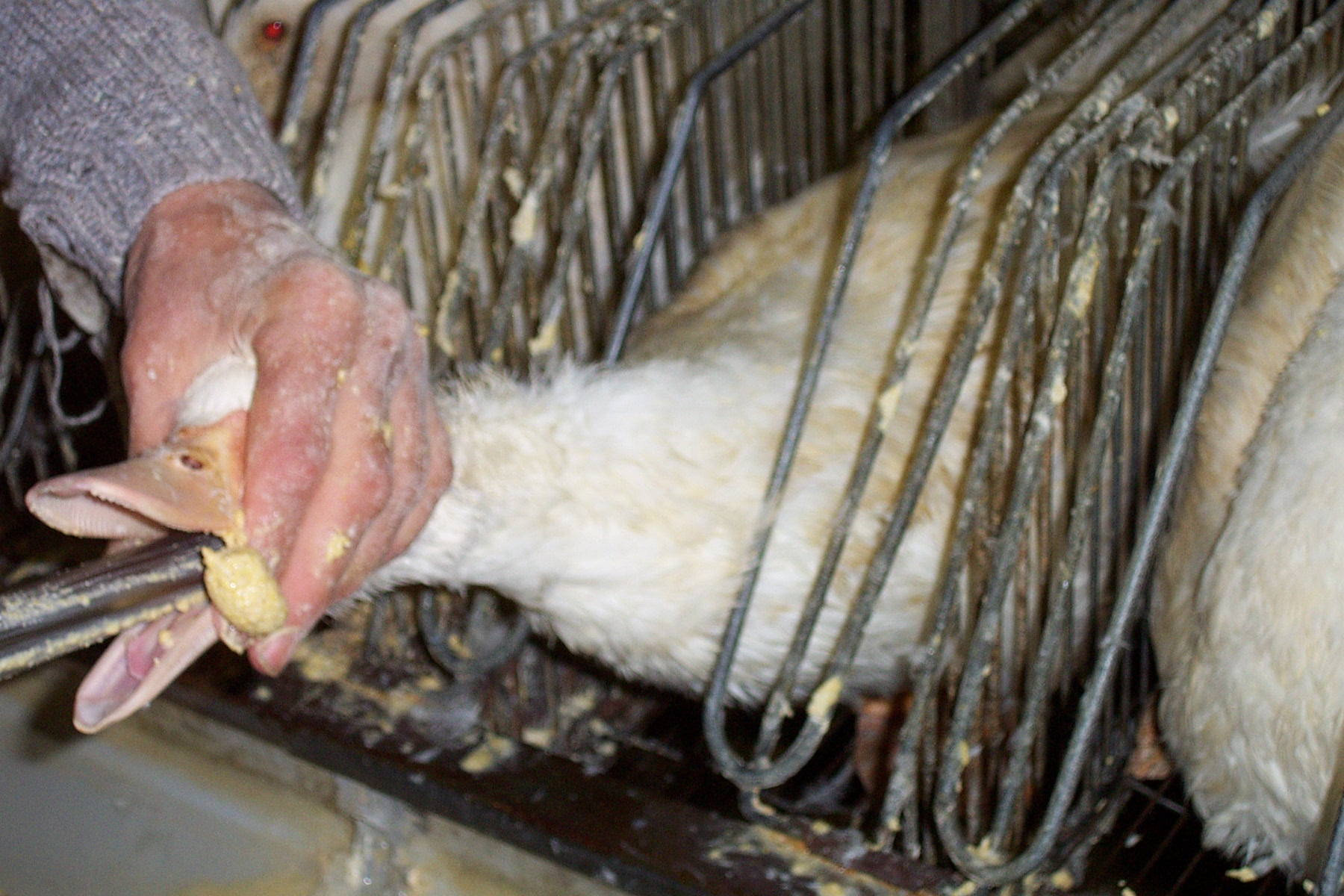
Gavage of a mulard duck in the production of foie gras

According to Paula Arcari, the animal–industrial complex involves commodification of animals under contemporary capitalism and includes every economic activity involving animals, such as food, animal research, entertainment, fashion, companionship, and so forth, all of which are seen as consequences of animal exploitations. The AIC is accused of involvement in a range of perceived wrongs, including animal agribusiness and its networks, or the agro-industrial complex (which includes animal agriculture, the meat and dairy industries, factory farms, poultry, apiculture, aquaculture, and the like), intersecting with various other industrial complexes that involve exploitation of animals, such as the pharmaceutical–industrial complex, medical–industrial complex, vivisection–industrial complex, cosmetic–industrial complex, entertainment–industrial complex, academic–industrial complex, security–industrial complex, prison–industrial complex, and so forth.

Philosopher Steven Best believes that all these industrial complexes interrelate with and reinforce the AIC by "exploiting the nonhuman animal slaves" of the AIC. For instance, the academic–industrial complex conducts research for the medical–industrial complex and Big Pharma by exploiting animals of the AIC in universities, military, and private vivisection laboratories and producing questionable research financed by the pharmaceutical–industrial complex for pharmaceutical capital. These drugs, which according to Best are dubiously researched, are then patented, fast-tracked into market sales with the help of the Food and Drug Administration, and advertised through a posited media–industrial complex. Best estimates that up to 115 million animals are killed globally every year to produce these drugs, which force human victims to succumb to the medical–industrial complex for profit by treating only the symptoms. Any dissent by animal rights activists is criminalized by the security–industrial complex, which incarcerates many of the dissenters in the prison–industrial complex. Twine considers the AIC as a significant component of the broader global food system.

== Impact ==
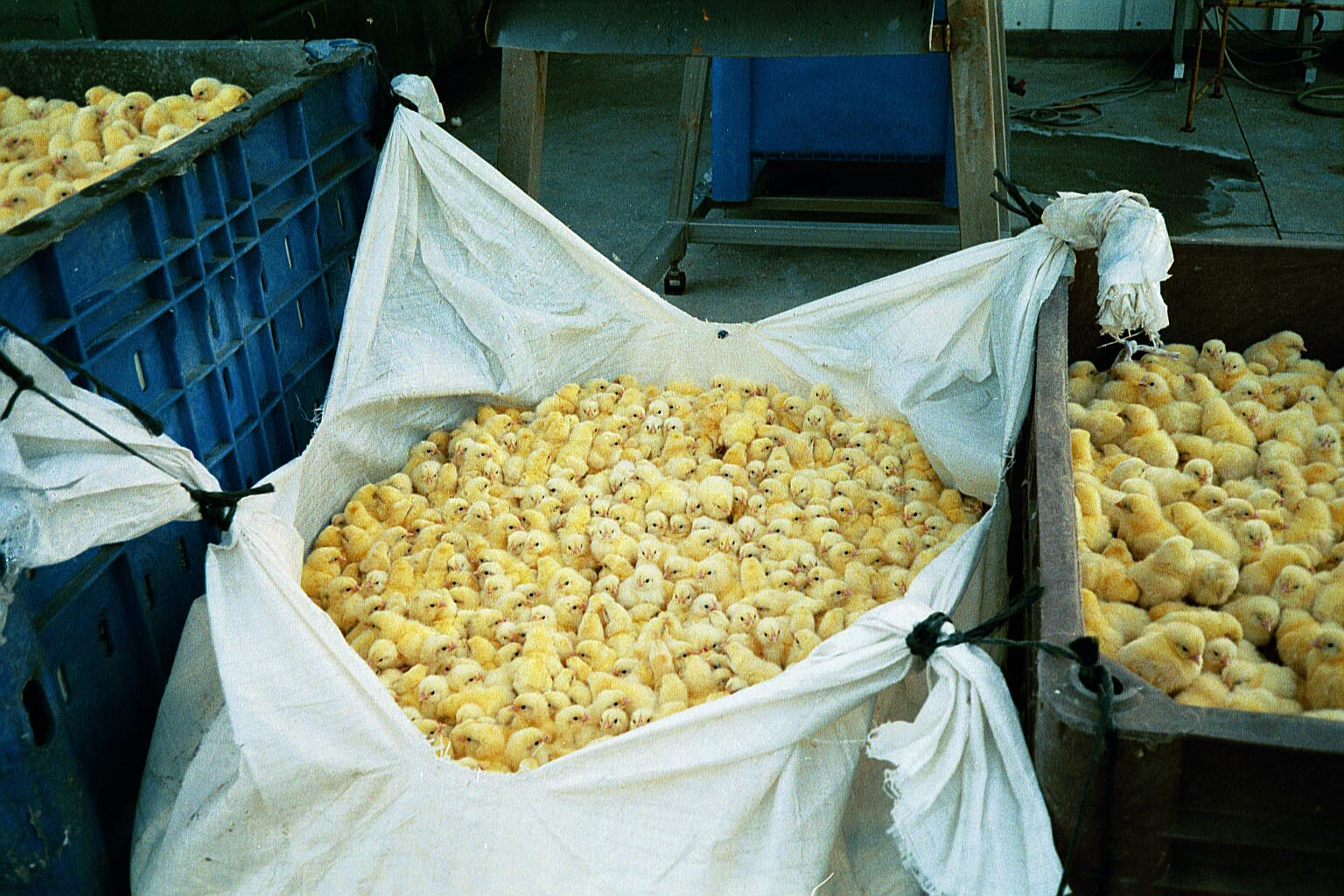
Male chicks shortly before they will be killed

Referring to the animal–industrial complex intersectionally, both Noske and Twine both claim the complex's negative impact on human minorities and the environment. According to Kathleen Stachowski, the AIC "naturalizes the human as a consumer of other animals." The enormity of the AIC, according to Stachowski, includes "its long reach into our lives, and how well it has done its job normalizing brutality toward the animals whose very existence is forgotten." She states that the corporate dairy industry, the government, and schools form the troika of the animal–industrial complex's immense influence, which hides from the public's view the animal rights violations and cruelties happening within the dairy industry. Thirukkumaran proposes that while critical animal theory acknowledges the universities' position as centers of knowledge production, it also states that the academy plays a problematic role of being a crucial mechanism within the AIC.

Borrowing from Dwight D. Eisenhower's military–industrial complex warning, Stachowski states that the vast and powerful AIC determines what children eat because people have failed to "guard against the acquisition of unwarranted influence" and that Eisenhower's parallels are strikingly similar to the AIC in that the complex involves "the very structure of our society" and completely influences the society's economic, political, and even spiritual spheres. Stachowski also states that the troika "hijacks" schoolchildren by promoting milk in the K-12 nutrition education curriculum and making them "eat the products of industrial animal production."

Steinfeld proposes that part of the AIC, animal agriculture has been implicated in environmental harms including climate change, ocean acidification, biodiversity loss, and the killing of more than 60 billion non-human land animals annually, ultimately contributing to the Holocene extinction, the only anthropogenic of all the mass extinctions in the planet's history. In 2011, more than 65.5 billion domestic farm animals were killed for meat alone, which is almost 8 times more than in 1961. This number excludes aquatic animals killed for food and non-food uses, which amounts to about 103.6 billion annually, and also male chicks killed in the egg industry, marine animals killed as bycatch, and dogs and cats eaten in Asia. All told, around 166 to over 200 billion land and aquatic animals are killed every year to provide humans with animal products for consumption, which some vegans and animal rights activists, among them Steven Best and journalist Chris Hedges, have described as an "animal holocaust". In the US alone, over 20 million farm animals die during transport to slaughterhouses annually. The extensive use of land and other resources for the production of meat instead of grain for human consumption is a leading cause of malnutrition, hunger, and famine around the world. According to conservation biologists Rodolfo Dirzo, Gerardo Ceballos, and Paul R. Ehrlich, in order to reduce meat consumption, which can "translate not only into less heat, but also more space for biodiversity," the "massive planetary monopoly of industrial meat production . . . needs to be curbed." They insist that this can be done while respecting the cultural traditions of indigenous peoples, for whom meat is an important source of protein.

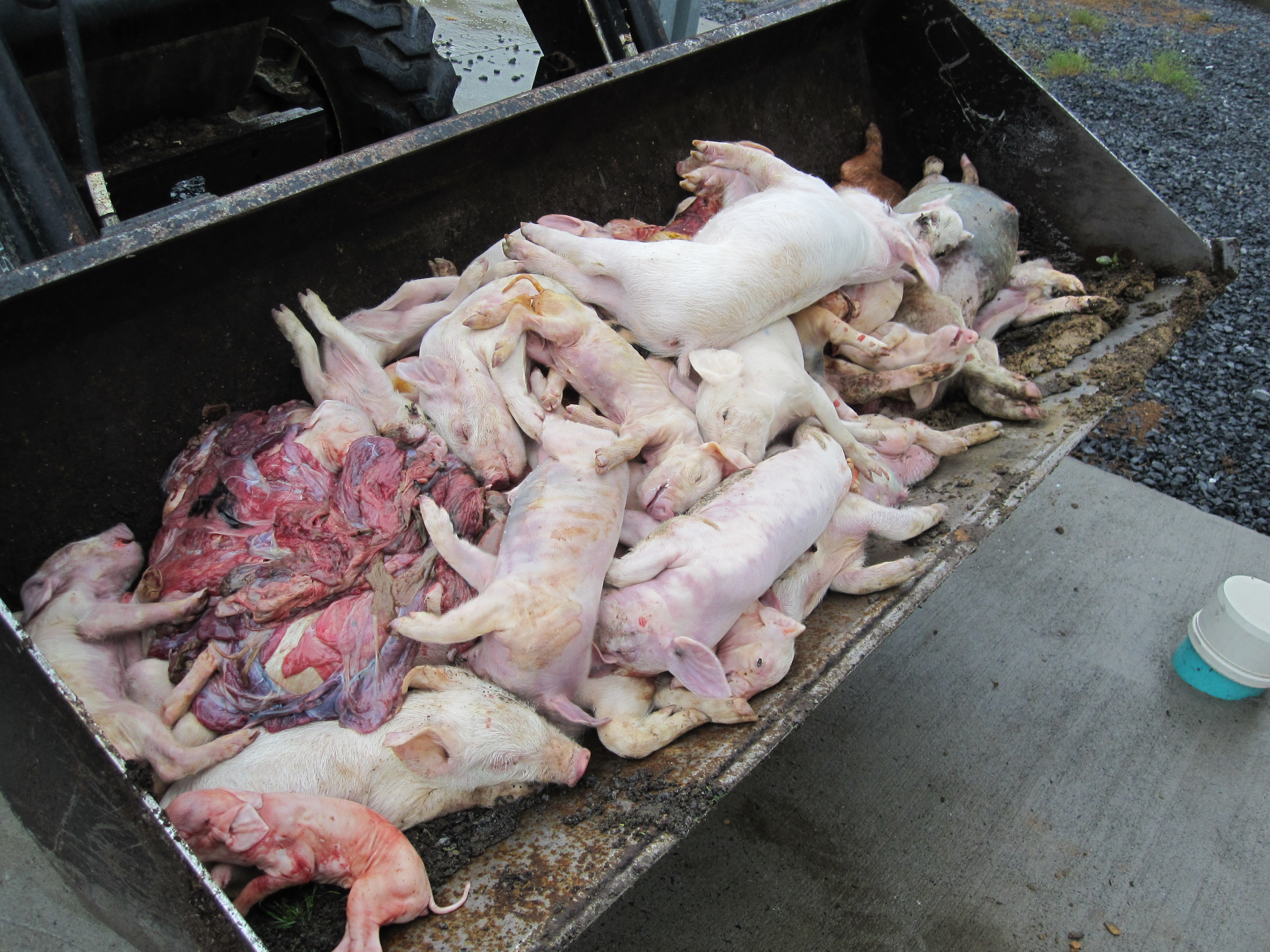
Dead infant pigs at a hog farm

Animal research and vivisection, another component of the AIC, is believed to be responsible to the immense suffering of hundreds of millions of nonhuman animals annually, and the deaths of at least 115 million animals. While the public is increasingly aware of this, chiefly due to animal advocacy, testaments of scientists, and growing direct evidence, it is argued that proponents of the AIC lobby against animal welfare regulation and animal rights activism. While industrialization of animal exploitation does not represent the entirety of human use of animals, the AIC remains the place where most of the animal exploitation takes place in modern times.

Scholars such as Nibert and Adams argue that the animal–industrial complex is also responsible for spreading of diseases from animals to humans such as the spread of bovine spongiform encephalopathy (mad cow disease) owing to beef consumption, and the ongoing COVID-19 pandemic. whose origin can be traced to the wet markets in China. According to Charlotte Blattner et al., the COVID-19 crisis revealed the AIC as "a vast and unstoppable machinery." Carol J. Adams considers responses to such crises as representing "a search for anthropocentric solutions to an anthropocentric problem"—that is, improve the supply of meat rather than examine the practice of meat eating—and stresses a closer scrutiny of the problem and a possible rejection of meat eating.

=== Commodification of nonhuman animals ===
One of the primary impacts of the animal–industrial complex is the commodification of nonhuman animals. In the book Education for Total Liberation, Meneka Repka cites Barbara Noski as saying that the commodification of nonhuman animals in food systems is directly linked to capitalist systems that prioritize "monopolistically inclined financial interests" over the well-being of humans, nonhumans, and the environment. Richard Twine furthers this stating that "corporate influences have had a direct interest through marketing, advertising, and flavour manipulation in constructing the consumption of animal products as a sensual material pleasure."

Writing about wild animals being imported into France in the 18th century, historian Louise Robbins writes that a "cultural biography of things" would show animals "sliding in and out of commodity status and taking on different values for different people" as they make their way from their homes to the streets of Paris. Sociologist Rhoda Wilkie has used the term "sentient commodity" to describe this view of how the conception of animals as commodities can shift depending on whether a human being forms a relationship with them. Geographers Rosemary-Claire Collard and Jessica Dempsey use the term "lively commodities."

Political scientist Sami Torssonen argues that animal welfare has itself been commodified since the 1990s because of public concern for animals. "Scientifically-certified welfare products," which Torssonen calls "sellfare," are "producible and salable at various points in the commodity chain," subject to competition like any other commodity. Social scientist Jacy Reese Anthis argues that, while there is no immanent right for animals or humans to not be commodified, there are strong practical reasons to oppose any commodification of animals, not just that which is cruel or egregious.

=== Exploitation of humans ===
Nibert argues that throughout history the oppression of exploited animals supported the oppression and exploitation of humans, and vice versa. The resulting change from one form of the control of state power to another, such as the older aristocracy being replaced by rising capitalism, was "every bit as violent and oppressive" as the former. The state-supported profit-driven capitalist expansion, for instance, was responsible for the killing and displacement of North America's indigenous peoples and animals. The creation of ranching operations led to intrusions onto Native American lands and violent displacement of the people in them in order to accommodate the growing numbers of oppressed animals, which in turn resulted in the creation of slaughterhouse operations. These slaughterhouses, Niebert argues, grew by exploiting vulnerable workforces, chiefly immigrants, who were undernourished, over-worked, poorly housed, and frequently sick, owing to the "macabre" nature of work as a result of the "assembly-line-style carnage" worsened by "the deafening squeals, bellows and bleating of terrified animals" being slaughtered. Starting in the 1980s, large food companies including Cargill, Conagra Brands, Tyson Foods moved most slaughterhouse operations to rural areas of the Southern United States which Niebert claims were more hostile to unionization efforts. In the Brazilian Amazon, Niebert argues around 25,000 people are working as virtual slaves for cattle ranchers.

In her book, Noske discusses the issue of health risks to human workers in slaughterhouses. Amy J. Fitzgerald points out to prison inmates in the United States and Canada being employed as a source of cheap labor in slaughtering and processing of animals, which scholars such as Robert R. Higgins consider as "environmental racism" wherein animals and animalized humans are symbolically paired, and as an economic rationale for the perpetuation of a specific prison population. According to Fitzgerald, this suggests a tendency toward psycho-social brutalization in such labor, which in turn jeopardize inmate rehabilitation.

==== Negative effects on workers ====
According to a 2019 report from OSHA, slaughterhouse workers are three times more likely to suffer serious injury than the average American worker. NPR reports that pig and cattle slaughterhouse workers are nearly seven times more likely to suffer repetitive strain injuries than average. The Guardian reports that on average there are two amputations a week involving slaughterhouse workers in the United States. On average, one employee of Tyson Foods, the largest meat producer in America, is injured and amputates a finger or limb per month according to a 2018 news article from BuzzFeed. The Bureau of Investigative Journalism reported that over a period of six years, in the UK 78 slaughter workers lost fingers, parts of fingers or limbs, more than 800 workers had serious injuries, and at least 4,500 had to take more than three days off after accidents. In a 2018 study in the Italian Journal of Food Safety, slaughterhouse workers are instructed to wear ear protectors to protect their hearing from the constant screams of animals being killed. A 2004 study in the Journal of Occupational and Environmental Medicine found that "excess risks were observed for mortality from all causes, all cancers, and lung cancer" in workers employed in the New Zealand meat processing industry.

According to Gail Eisnit;"

The worst thing, worse than the physical danger, is the emotional toll. If you work in the stick pit [where hogs are killed] for any period of time—that let's [sic] you kill things but doesn't let you care. You may look a hog in the eye that's walking around in the blood pit with you and think, 'God, that really isn't a bad looking animal.' You may want to pet it. Pigs down on the kill floor have come up to nuzzle me like a puppy. Two minutes later I had to kill them - beat them to death with a pipe. I can't care.

— Gail A. Eisnitz,

The act of slaughtering animals, or of raising or transporting animals for slaughter, may engender psychological stress or trauma in the people involved. A 2016 study in Organization indicates, "Regression analyses of data from 10,605 Danish workers across 44 occupations suggest that slaughterhouse workers consistently experience lower physical and psychological well-being along with increased incidences of negative coping behavior". A 2009 study by criminologist Amy Fitzgerald indicates, "slaughterhouse employment increases total arrest rates, arrests for violent crimes, arrests for rape, and arrests for other sex offenses in comparison with other industries". As authors from the PTSD Journal explain, "These employees are hired to kill animals, such as pigs and cows that are largely gentle creatures. Carrying out this action requires workers to disconnect from what they are doing and from the creature standing before them. This emotional dissonance can lead to consequences such as domestic violence, social withdrawal, anxiety, drug and alcohol abuse, and PTSD".

Several sources report slaughterhouses in the United States commonly illegally employ and exploit underage workers and illegal immigrants. In 2010, Human Rights Watch described slaughterhouse line work in the United States as a human rights crime. In a report by Oxfam America, slaughterhouse workers were observed not being allowed breaks, were often required to wear diapers, and were paid below minimum wage.

== See also ==
- Ag-gag
- Animal liberation
- Concentrated animal feeding operation
- Golden Triangle of Meat-packing
- List of industrial complexes
- Live export
- Meat industry
- Meat packing industry
- World Scientists' Warning to Humanity
