= Richard Twine (sociologist) =

British sociologist (born 1974)

External audio
- "Episode 19: Vegan Killjoys at the Table with Richard Twine"; Twine discusses the concept of vegan killjoys with Siobhan O'Sullivan (2016)
- "Episode 233: Animals and the climate crisis with Richard Twine"; Twine discusses The Climate Crisis and Other Animals with Josh Milburn (2025)

Richard Twine (born 1974) is a British sociologist whose research addresses environmental sociology as well as gender, human/animal and science studies. He is noted for his "foundational" work in critical animal studies, as well as his contributions to ecofeminism. His work includes developing Barbara Noske's notion of the animal-industrial complex and theorizing the "vegan killjoy", building on Sara Ahmed's "feminist killjoy".

Twine is a reader in sociology in the Department of History, Geography & Social Sciences at Edge Hill University, where he is the co-director of the Centre for Human-Animal Studies. He is also the chair of the Research Advisory Committee of The Vegan Society. He is the author of 2010's Animals as Biotechnology and 2024's The Climate Crisis and Other Animals, as well as a co-editor of 2014's The Rise of Critical Animal Studies and 2024's Violence and Harm in the Animal Industrial Complex.

== Career ==
Twine studied for a Bachelor of Arts in Sociology and Psychology at the University of Stirling, graduating in 1995, and then went on to study for a Master of Arts in Sociology at the University of Essex, which he completed in 1996. He was awarded his PhD in Sociology from Manchester Metropolitan University in 2002. His thesis, supervised by Gail Hawkes and Sue Scott and examined by Anne Witz, was entitled Ecofeminism and the 'New' Sociologies - A Collaboration Against Dualism.

After completing his studies, Twine spent a decade at Lancaster University, where he was based within the ESRC Centre for Economic and Social Aspects of Genomics. While at Lancaster, he published Animals as Biotechnology: Ethics, Sustainability and Critical Animal Studies as part of the Earthscan Science in Society Series. This was "the first book fully dedicated to" critical animal studies. It offered, in the words of one reviewer, "an impressive analysis of the biotech and meat industries from an unapologetically pro-animal perspective". In 2012, he published an article in the Journal for Critical Animal Studies, developing Barbara Noske's idea of the animal-industrial complex as research method and concept central to critical animal studies.

After finishing at Lancaster, Twine worked briefly at the University of Glasgow and the UCL Institute of Education. He published the collection The Rise of Critical Animal Studies: From the Margins to the Centre, co-edited with Nik Taylor, with Routledge in 2014. The same year, he joined Edge Hill University. He also published a paper in Societies in which he drew upon Sara Ahmed's notion of a feminist killjoy, coining the idea of a "vegan killjoy". Twine argues that, in a culture in which meat-eating is the norm, a vegan can, by their mere presence, challenge anthropocentric attitudes and practices, affecting the enjoyment that others have in eating animal products. This, Twine claims, can serve as "critical deconstructive work". The idea of the vegan killjoy has been widely deployed in vegan studies and related fields. His book The Climate Crisis and Other Animals, published by Sydney University Press, and his co-edited collection Violence and Harm in the Animal Industrial Complex: Human-Animal Entanglements were both released in 2024.

As of 2024, Twine is a reader in sociology in the Department of History, Geography & Social Sciences at Edge Hill and co-director of the university's Centre for Human-Animal Studies.

== Selected publications ==
- Twine, Richard (2010). Animals as Biotechnology: Ethics, Sustainability and Critical Animal Studies. London: Earthscan.
- Twine, Richard (2010). "Intersectional disgust? Animals and (eco)feminism". Feminism & Psychology 20 (3): 397–406. doi:10.1177/0959353510368284.
- Twine, Richard (2012). "Revealing the 'Animal-Industrial Complex' – A Concept & Method for Critical Animal Studies?" Journal for Critical Animal Studies 10 (1): 12–39.
- Twine, Richard (2014). "Vegan Killjoys at the Table—Contesting Happiness and Negotiating Relationships with Food Practices". Societies 4 (4): 623–39. doi:10.3390/soc4040623.
- Taylor, Nik, and Richard Twine, eds. (2014). The Rise of Critical Animal Studies: From the Margins to the Centre. London: Routledge.
- Twine, Richard (2017). "Materially Constituting a Sustainable Food Transition: The Case of Vegan Eating Practice". Sociology 52 (1): 166–81. doi:10.1177/0038038517726647.
- Twine, Richard (2024). The Climate Crisis and Other Animals. Sydney: Sydney University Press.
- Hunnicutt, Gwen, Richard Twine, and Kenneth Mentor, eds. (2024). Violence and Harm in the Animal Industrial Complex: Human-Animal Entanglements. Abingdon: Routledge.
