= Piers Beirne =

- Born: London, England

Education
- Education: PhD in Sociology, Durham University; BA in Sociology, Essex University

Philosophical work
- Era: Contemporary philosophy
- Region: Western philosophy
- Institutions: University of Southern Maine
- Main interests: Sociology, Animal abuse studies, Green criminology,
- Notable ideas: Nonspeciesist Criminology

Piers Beirne is an Anglo-Irish emeritus professor of sociology and legal studies at the University of Southern Maine. Having been based in the United States since 1976, he continues to research and write about our relationships with the more than human world. A leading scholar in green criminology and animal abuse studies, he is the founder of nonspeciesist criminology.

Beirne is one of the first criminologists to challenge his own field for its anthropocentrism and speciesism in focusing on exclusively human criminality and crime victims who are invariably humans. Beirne considers speciesism as the ideological anchor of the intersecting networks of the animal–industrial complex, such as factory farms, vivisection, hunting and fishing, zoos and aquaria, wildlife trade, and so forth.

== Works ==
Beirne's chief work includes the book Murdering Animals: Writings On Theriocide, Homicide, And Nonspeciesist Criminology with Ian O'Donnell and Janine Janssen, published in 2018 in London by Palgrave Macmillan. In his book, Beirne uses the term "theriocide" to refer to the diverse human actions that cause the deaths of animals other than humans, ranging from one-on-one killings to that which happen in small groups or in invisibilised social institutions such as factory farms and research laboratories.

Beirne's other works include the following:

Books

- Inventing Criminology: Essays on the Rise of `Homo Criminalis’, New York: SUNY Press (1993).
- Issues in Green Criminology: Confronting Harms Against Environments, Humanity and Other Animals, Willan (with Nigel South) (2007).
- Confronting Animal Abuse: Law, Criminology and Human-Animal Relations, Rowman & Littlefield (2009).
- Hogarth's Art of Animal Cruelty: Satire, Suffering and Pictorial Propaganda, London: Palgrave Macmillan (2015).
- Criminology: A Sociological Approach (6th edition), Oxford University Press (with James Messerschmidt) (2015).
- Palgrave International Handbook on Animal Abuse Studies, London: Palgrave Macmillan, edited with Jennifer Maher and Harriet Pierpoint (2017).

Articles

- With Michael J. Lynch, 'On the Geometry of Speciesist Policing: The Federal Bureau of Investigation's Animal Cruelty Data', International Journal for Crime, Justice and Social Democracy, 12(2): 137-149. doi: 10.5204/ijcjsd.2631 (2023).
- 'COVID-19 as an anthroponosis: Toward a nonspeciesist criminology of human-to-animal pathogen transmission’, International Journal for Crime, Justice and Social Democracy, 11(3): 139-152. DOI: https://doi.org/10.5204/ijcjsd.2093 (2022).
- 'Animals, Women and Terms of Abuse: Towards a Cultural Etymology of Con(e)y, Cunny, Cunt and C*nt’, Critical Criminology, 28(3): 327-349. DOI: 10.1007/s10612-019-09460-w (2021).
- ‘Wildlife Trade and COVID-19: Towards a Criminology of Anthropogenic Pathogen Spillover’, British Journal of Criminology, 61(3): 607-626. DOI: 10.1093/bjc/azaa084 (2021).
- ‘Raw, Roast or Half-Baked? Hogarth’s Beef in Calais Gate’, Theoretical Criminology, 22(3): 426-44. DOI: 10.1177/1362480618787174 (2018).

== See also ==
- Animal–industrial complex
- Critical animal studies
