= David Nibert =

American sociologist

- Born: 1953 (age 72–73); U.S.

Philosophical work
- Era: Contemporary philosophy
- Region: Western philosophy
- Institutions: Wittenberg University
- Main interests: Sociology, animal rights theory
- Notable ideas: Animal rights advocacy

David Alan Nibert (born 1953) is an American sociologist, author, activist and professor of sociology at Wittenberg University. He is the co-organizer of the Section on Animals and Society of the American Sociological Association. In 2005, he received their Award for Distinguished Scholarship.

== Work ==
Nibert connects animal rights theory with other economic and sociological theories. According to Nibert, speciesism is an ideology that seeks to legitimize animal slavery, defending the discrimination against sentient beings on account of their species. He promotes veganism and abolitionism. Nibert offers an "Animals and Society" course at Wittenberg University to spread awareness of animal oppression. He said:

Increasingly, social scientists are focusing on the ethical, environmental and social consequences of human treatment of other animals. This course will examine how human societies have viewed and treated other animals and how the interactions and the structure of the relationship between humans and other animals affect both those animals and human social organization. For example, some scholars argue that cultural practices that define and use nonhuman animals as food contribute significantly to various forms of environmental devastation. Human health research indicates that high rates of heart disease and cancer in many cultures can be attributed to the consumption of animals. Others suggest that human perception and treatment of nonhuman animals are related in significant ways to such enduring problems as racism, sexism and violence against vulnerable groups of people. This course will examine the causes of human exploitation of other animals and the issues that frame the animal rights debate.

== Publications ==
=== Books ===
- Animal Oppression and Capitalism. Praeger Publishing, 2017. ISBN 978-1440850738
- Animal Oppression and Human Violence: Domesecration, Capitalism, and Global Conflict. Columbia University Press, 2013. ISBN 0-2311-5189-6 (review)
- "Origins and Consequences of the Animal Industrial Complex" in Steven Best; Richard Kahn; Anthony J. Nocella II; Peter McLaren (eds.). The Global Industrial Complex: Systems of Domination . Rowman & Littlefield, 2011 ISBN 978-0739136980
- Animal Rights/Human Rights: Entanglements of Oppression and Liberation. Rowman & Littlefield, 2002. ISBN 0-7425-1776-4 (0-7425-1776-4)
- Hitting the Lottery Jackpot: State Governments and the Taxing of Dreams. Monthly Review Press, 1999. ISBN 1-58367-014-9

=== Selected articles ===
- Consuming the Surplus: Expanding "Meat" Consumption and Animal Oppression. International Journal of Sociology & Social Policy. Year: 2004. 24(9):76-96. With Bill Winders
- Humans and other animals: sociology's moral and intellectual challenge. International Journal of Sociology and Social Policy. Year: 2003 Volume: 23 Issue: 3 pp. 4–25.

== See also ==
- Animal–industrial complex
- Critical animal studies
- List of animal rights advocates
- List of vegans
