= Meat Atlas =

Environmental groups' report on meat production

Meat Atlas – Facts and figures about the animals we eat
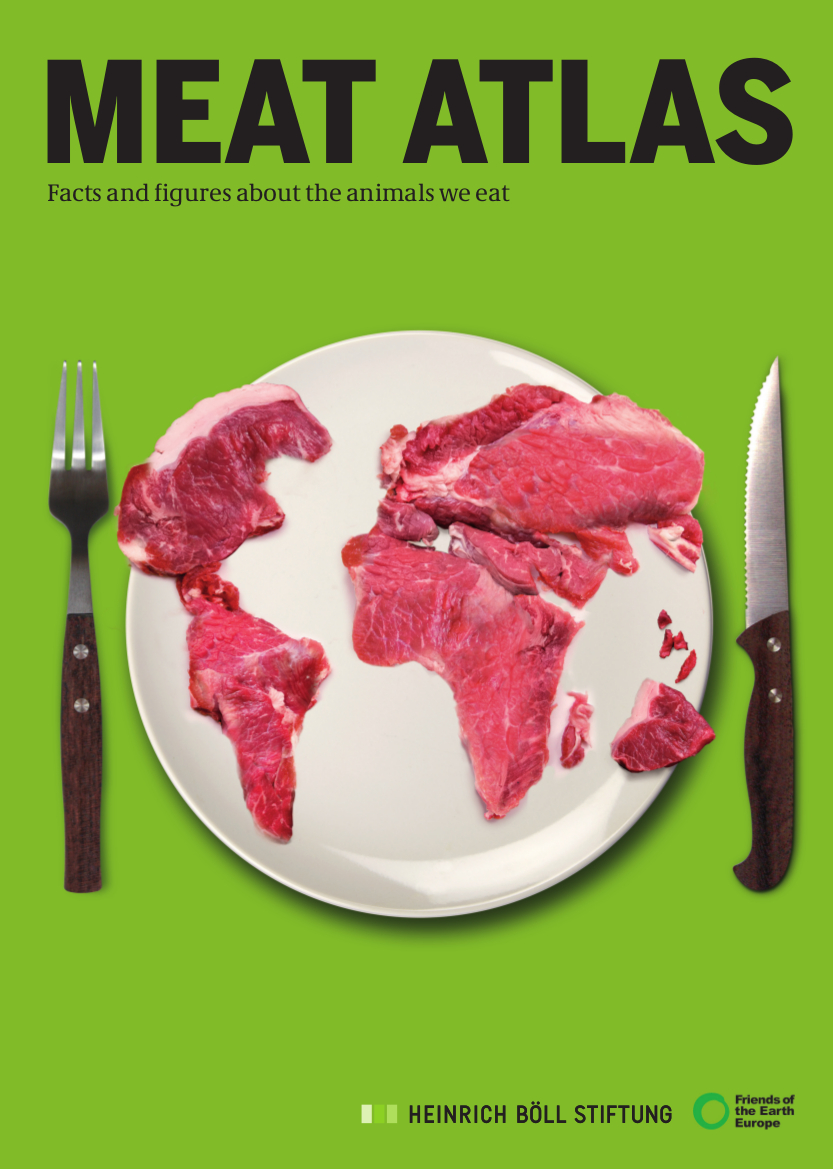
- Original title: Der Fleischatlas
- Language: English and German
- Subject: Meat production, intensive animal agriculture, environment
- Publisher: Heinrich Böll Foundation and Friends of the Earth Europe
- Publication date: January 2014
- Publication place: Germany
- Media type: Online / print
- Pages: 68

Meat Atlas (Der Fleischatlas) is an annual report, published by the Heinrich Böll Foundation and Friends of the Earth Europe, on the methods and impact of industrial animal agriculture and the meat industry. Barbara Unmuessig, the foundation's president, said that the report's goal is to inform consumers about the consequences of increasingly industrialized meat production.

== Synopsis ==
=== Overview ===
According to the report, based on figures from the United Nations' Food and Agriculture Organization, the production of one kilogram (2 lb 3 oz) of beef requires 15,455 litres (4,083 US gal) of water, cheese 5,000 litres, rice 3,400 litres, and carrots 131 litres.

Over 75 kg (165 lb) of meat is consumed in the United States per person per year, 60 kg in Germany, 38 kg in China, and under 20 kg in Africa.

Pigs can reach their market weight with 10–15 percent less food if they are kept on antibiotics, but overuse increases the likelihood of antibiotic-resistant bacteria, so-called "superbugs."

== See also ==
- Beef hormone controversy
- Commodity status of animals
