= Human uses of animals =

Overview of humans' uses of animals

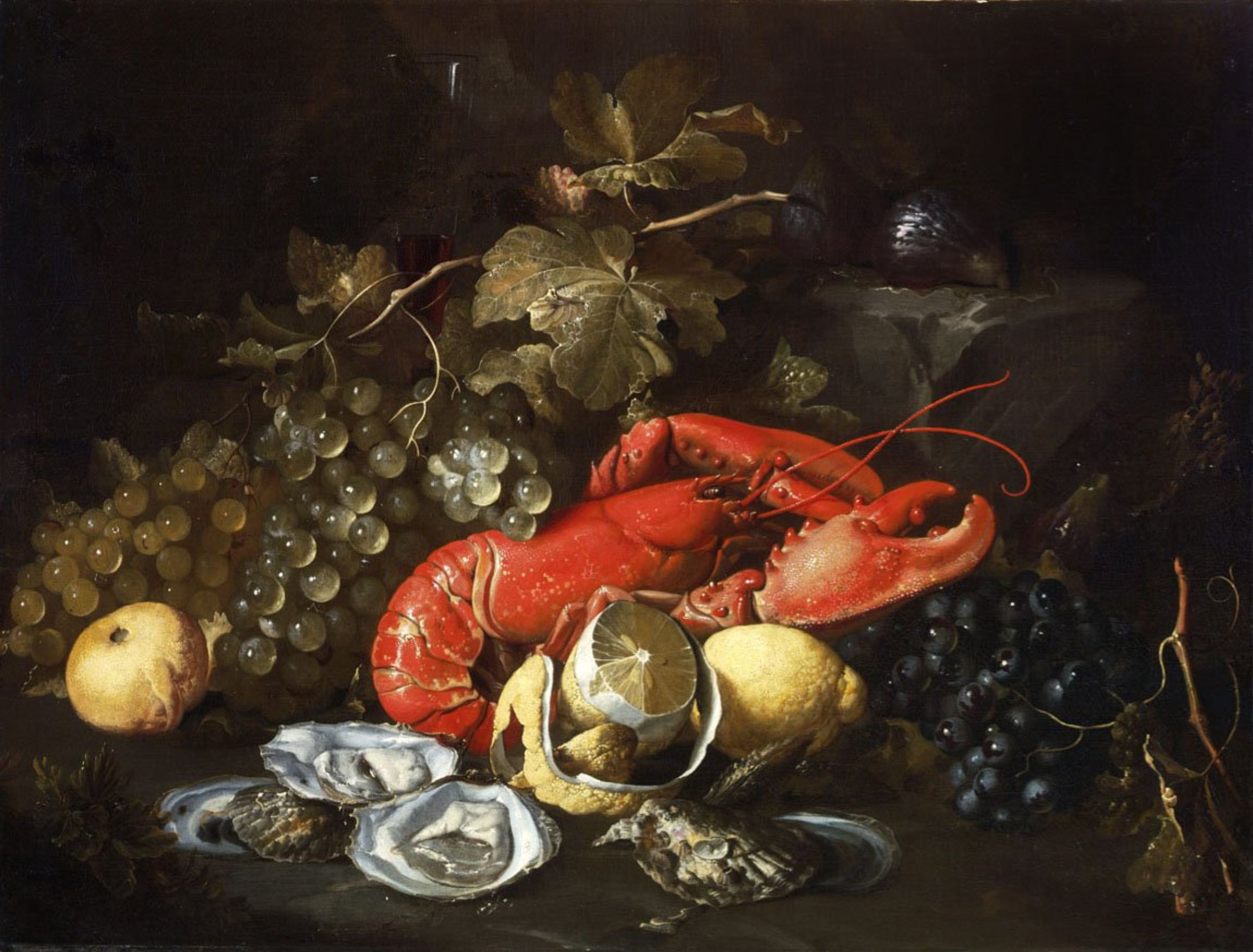
Symbolic use: Still Life with Lobster and Oysters by Alexander Coosemans, c. 1660

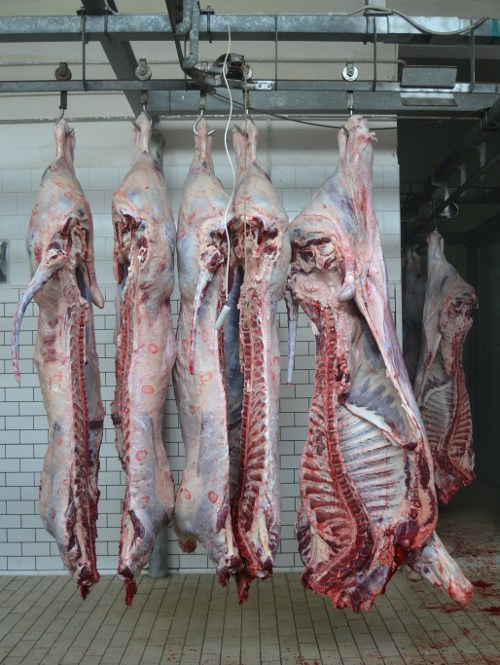
Practical use: cattle carcass in a slaughterhouse

Human uses of animals include both practical uses, such as the production of food and clothing, and symbolic uses, such as in art, literature, mythology, and religion. All of these are elements of culture, broadly understood. Animals used in these ways include fish, crustaceans, insects, molluscs, mammals and birds.

Economically, animals provide meat, whether farmed or hunted, and until the arrival of mechanised transport, terrestrial mammals provided a large part of the power used for work and transport. Animals serve as models in biological research, such as in genetics, and in drug testing.

Many species are kept as pets, the most popular being mammals, especially dogs and cats. These are often anthropomorphised.

Animals such as horses and deer are among the earliest subjects of art, being found in the Upper Paleolithic cave paintings such as at Lascaux. Major artists such as Albrecht Dürer, George Stubbs and Edwin Landseer are known for their portraits of animals. Animals further play a wide variety of roles in literature, film, mythology, and religion.

== Context ==
Culture consists of the social behaviour and norms found in human societies and transmitted through social learning. Cultural universals in all human societies include expressive forms like art, music, dance, ritual, religion, and technologies like tool usage, cooking, shelter, and clothing. The concept of material culture covers physical expressions such as technology, architecture and art, whereas immaterial culture includes principles of social organization, mythology, philosophy, literature, and science. Anthropology has traditionally studied the roles of non-human animals in human culture in two opposed ways: as physical resources that humans used; and as symbols or concepts through totemism and animism. More recently, anthropologists have also seen other animals as participants in human social interactions. This article describes the roles played by other animals in human culture, so defined, both practical and symbolic.

== Practical uses ==
=== As food ===
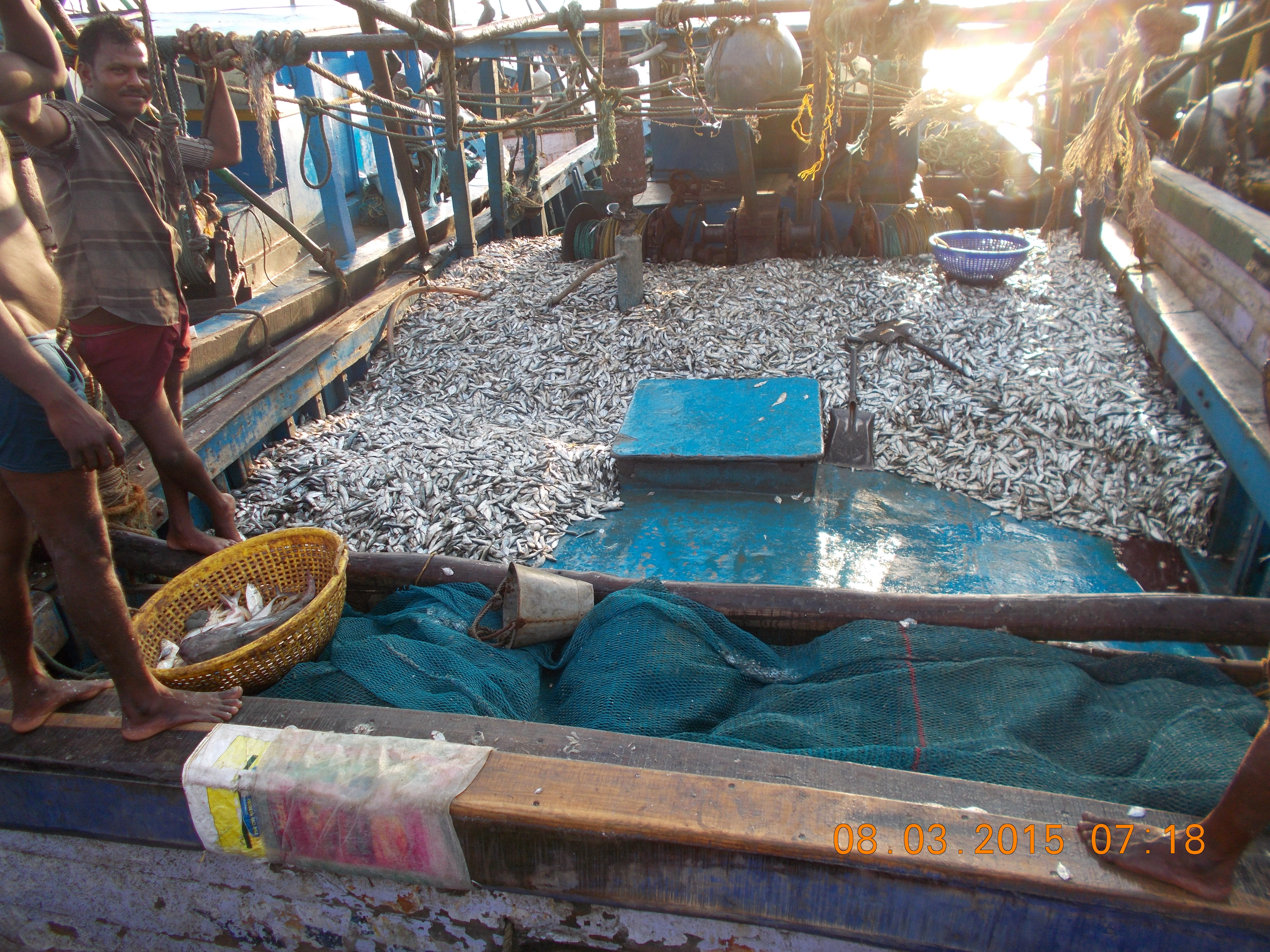
Traditional fishing trawler filled with sardines, India

The human population exploits a large number of non-human animal species for food, both of domesticated livestock species in animal husbandry and, mainly at sea, by hunting wild species.

Marine fish of many species, such as herring, cod, tuna, mackerel and anchovy, are caught and killed commercially, and can form an important part of the human diet, including protein and fatty acids. Commercial fish farms concentrate on a smaller number of species, including salmon and carp.

Invertebrates including cephalopods like squid and octopus; crustaceans such as prawns, crabs, and lobsters; and bivalve or gastropod molluscs such as clams, oysters, cockles, and whelks are all hunted or farmed for food.

Non-human mammals form a large part of the livestock raised for meat across the world. They include (2011) around 1.4 billion cattle, 1.2 billion sheep, 1 billion domestic pigs, and (1985) over 700 million rabbits.

=== For clothing and textiles ===
Textiles from the most utilitarian to the most luxurious are often made from non-human animal fibres such as wool, camel hair, angora, cashmere, and mohair. Hunter-gatherers have used non-human animal sinews as lashings and bindings. Leather from cattle, pigs and other species is widely used to make shoes, handbags, belts and many other items. Other animals have been hunted and farmed for their fur, to make items such as coats and hats, again ranging from simply warm and practical to the most elegant and expensive. Snakes and other reptiles are traded in the tens of thousands each year to meet the demand for exotic leather; some of this trade is legal and sustainable, some of it is illegal and unsustainable, but for many species insufficient data is available to make a determination either way.

Dyestuffs including carmine (cochineal), shellac, and kermes have been made from the bodies of insects. In classical times, Tyrian purple was taken from sea snails such as Stramonita haemastoma (Muricidae) for the clothing of royalty, as recorded by Aristotle and Pliny the Elder.

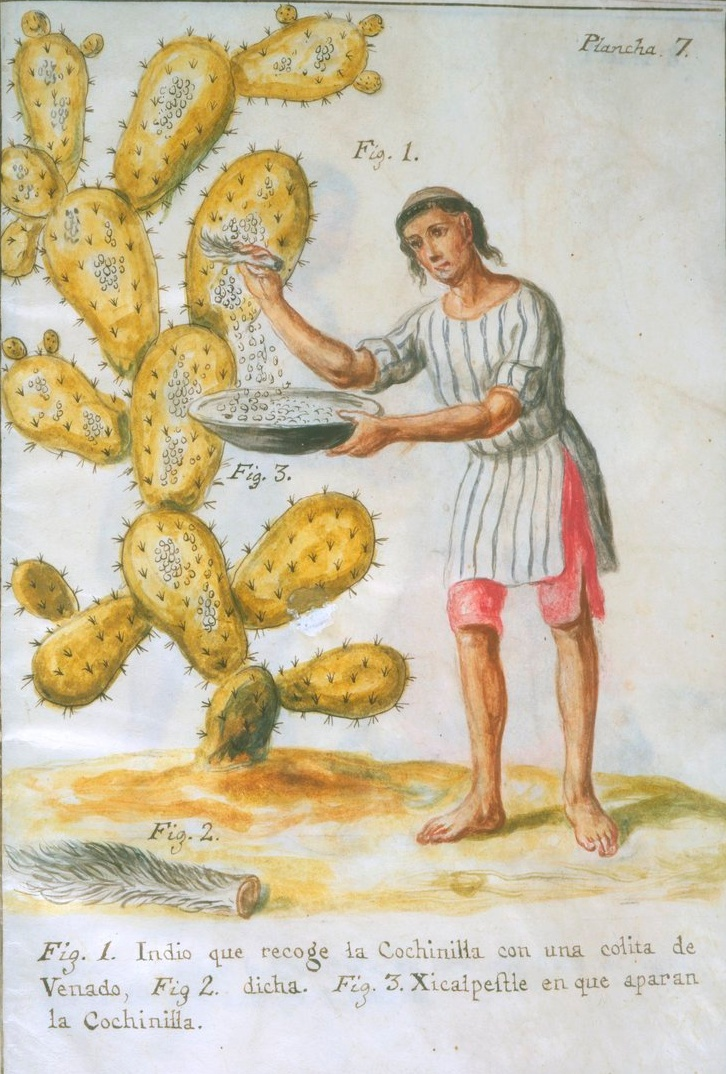
Animal dyestuff: cochineal scale insects being collected from a prickly pear, 1777

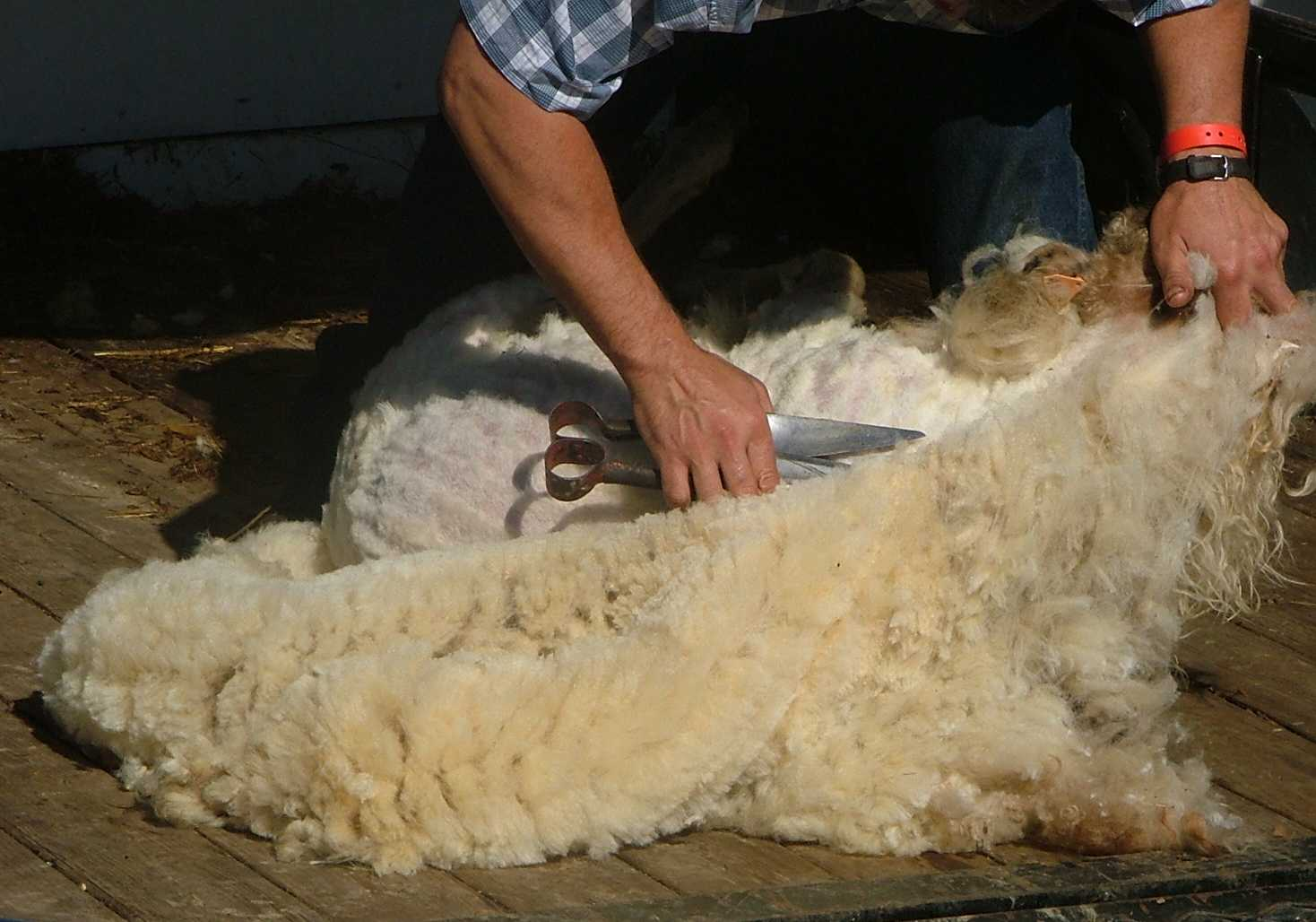
A sheep being shorn of its fleece with traditional blade shears

=== For work and transport ===
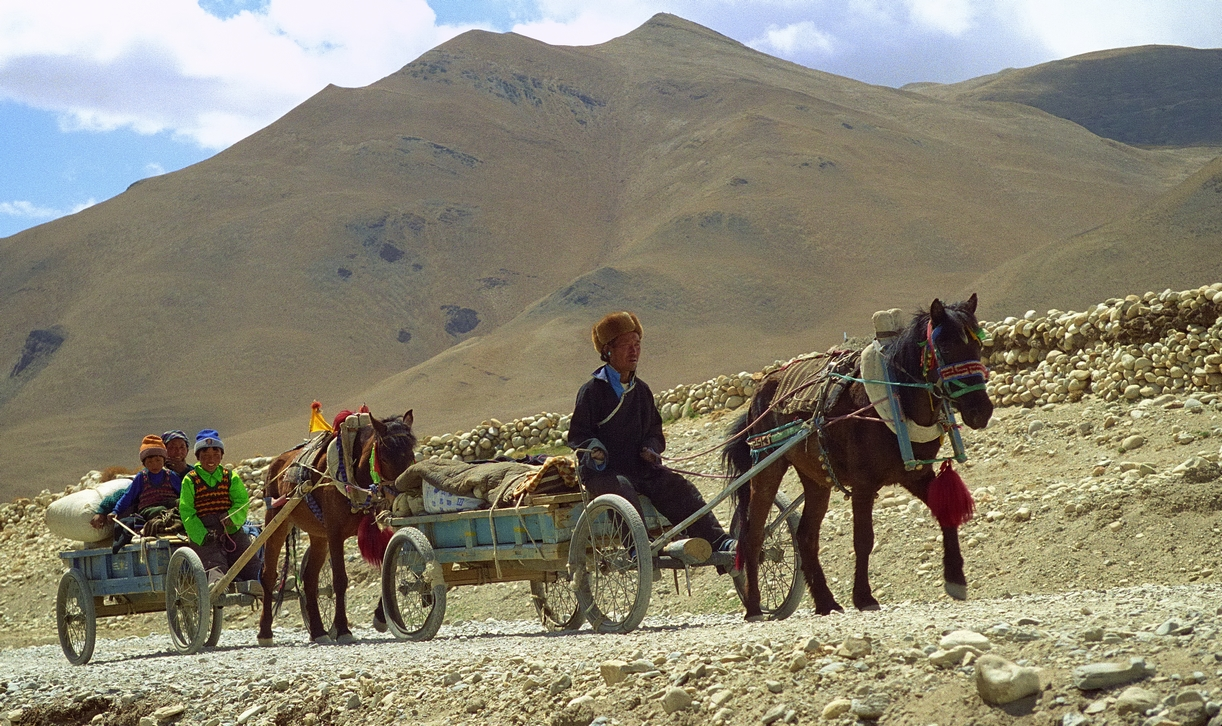
Horses pulling wagons in Tibet

Working domestic animals including cattle, horses, yaks, camels, and elephants have been used for work and transport from the origins of agriculture, their numbers declining with the arrival of mechanized transport and agricultural machinery. In 2004 they still provided some 80% of the power for the mainly small farms in the third world, and some 20% of the world's transport, again mainly in rural areas. In mountainous regions unsuitable for wheeled vehicles, pack animals continue to transport goods.

Police, military and immigration/customs personnel exploit dogs and horses to perform a variety of tasks, which cannot be done by humans. In some cases, smart rats have been used.

=== In science ===
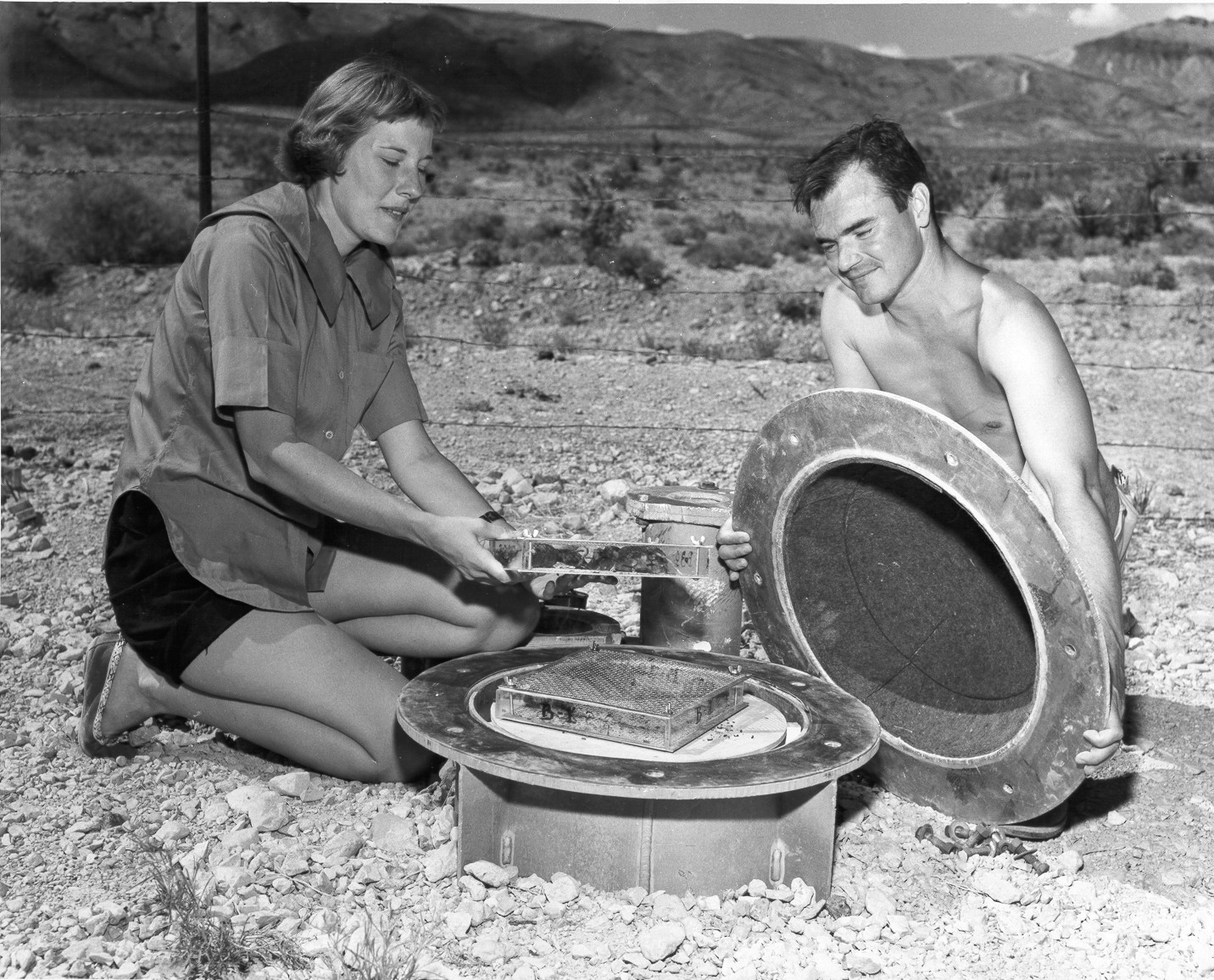
Laboratory mice being prepared for a radiation test at Los Alamos in 1957

Animals such as the fruit fly Drosophila melanogaster, the zebrafish, the chicken and the house mouse, serve a major role in science as experimental models, being exploited both in fundamental biological research, such as in genetics, and in the development of new medicines, which must be tested exhaustively to demonstrate their safety. Millions of non-human mammals, especially mice and rats, are used in experiments each year.

A knockout mouse is a genetically modified mouse with an inactivated gene, replaced or disrupted with an artificial piece of DNA. They enable the study of sequenced genes whose functions are unknown.

=== In medicine ===
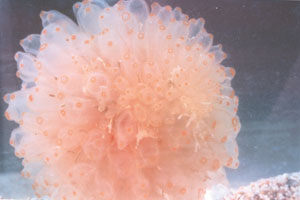
The tunicate Ecteinascidia turbinata yields the anti-cancer drug Yondelis.

Vaccines have been made using other animals since their discovery by Edward Jenner in the 18th century. He noted that inoculation with live cowpox afforded protection against the more dangerous smallpox. In the 19th century, Louis Pasteur developed an attenuated (weakened) vaccine for rabies. In the 20th century, vaccines for the viral diseases mumps and polio were developed using animal cells grown in vitro.

An increasing variety of drugs are based on toxins and other molecules of animal origin. The cancer drug Yondelis was isolated from the tunicate Ecteinascidia turbinata. One of dozens of toxins made by the predatory cone snail Conus geographus is used as Prialt in pain relief.

Different non-human animals unwillingly help humans with creating medicine that can treat certain human diseases. For example, the anticoagulant properties of snake venom are key to potential medical use. These toxins can be used to treat heart disease, pulmonary embolism, and many other diseases, all of which may originate from blood clots.

=== In hunting ===
Non-human animals, and products made from them, are used to assist in hunting. Humans have used hunting dogs to help chase down animals such as deer, wolves, and foxes; birds of prey from eagles to small falcons are used in falconry, hunting birds or mammals; and tethered cormorants have been used to catch fish.

Dendrobatid poison dart frogs, especially those in the genus Phyllobates, secrete toxins such as Pumiliotoxin 251D and Allopumiliotoxin 267A powerful enough to be used to poison the tips of blowpipe darts.

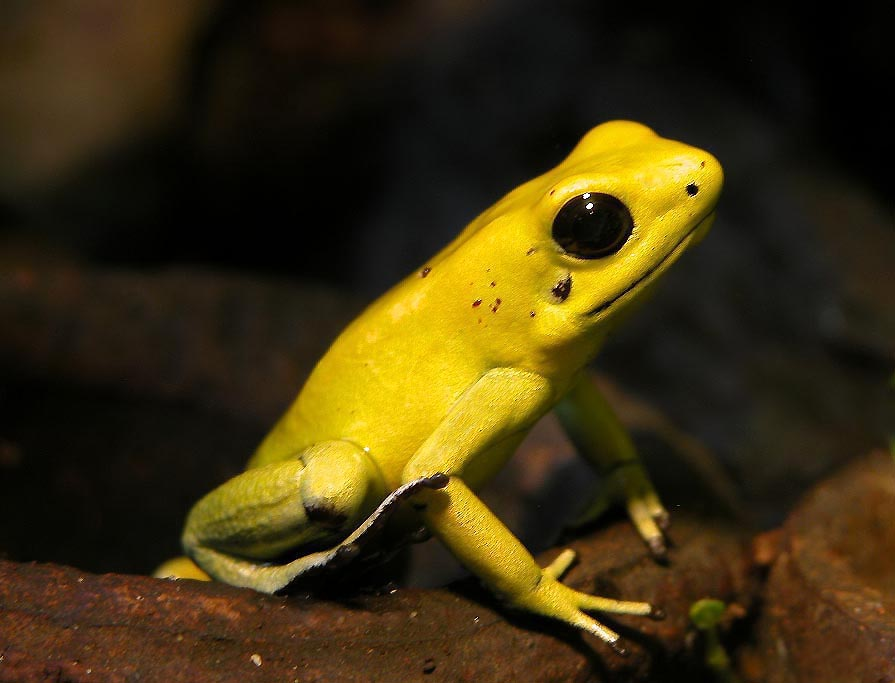
A poison dart frog, Phyllobates terribilis, secretes toxins powerful enough to be used to tip blowpipe darts.

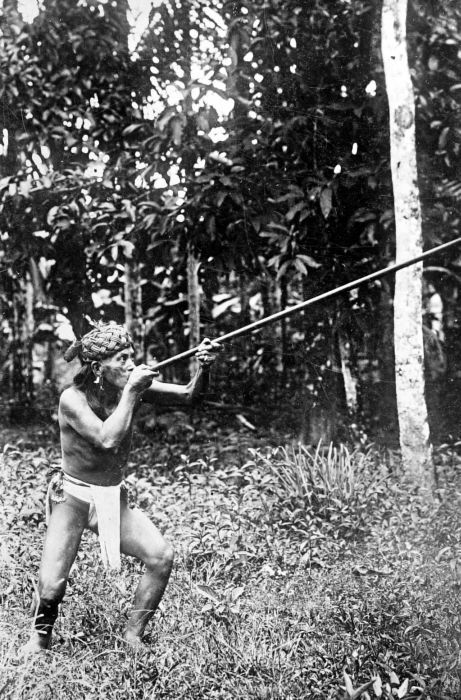
Dayak man hunting with blowpipe

=== As pets ===
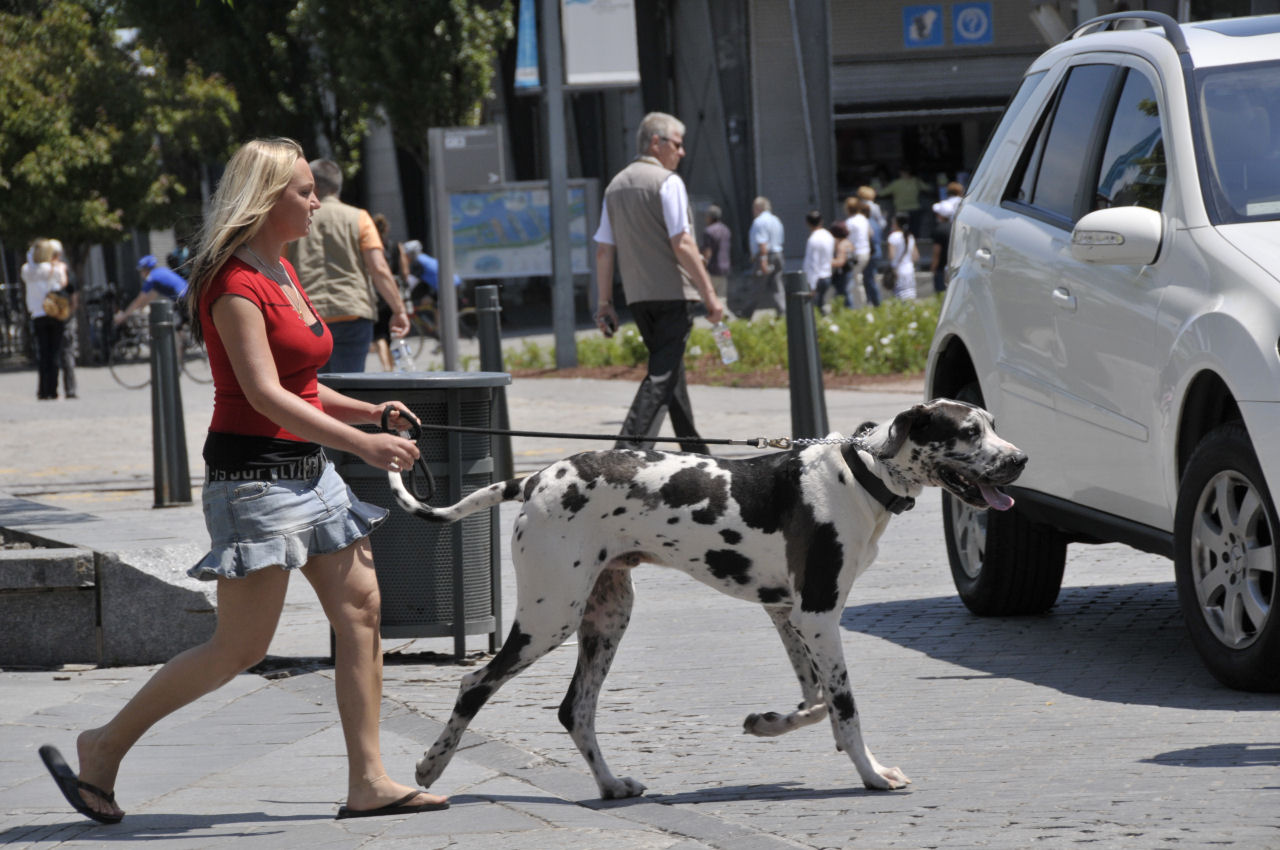
A pet dog

A wide variety of animals are used as pets, from invertebrates such as tarantulas and octopuses, insects including praying mantises, reptiles such as snakes and chameleons, and birds including canaries, parakeets and parrots. However, non-human mammals are the most popular pets in the Western world, with the most utilized species being dogs, cats, and rabbits. For example, in America in 2012 there were some 78 million dogs, 86 million cats, and 3.5 million rabbits. Anthropomorphism, the attribution of human traits, emotions, or intentions to non-human animals, is an important aspect of the way that humans relate to other animals such as pets. There is a tension between the role of other animals as companions to humans, and their existence as individuals with rights of their own; ignoring those rights is a form of speciesism.

=== For sport ===
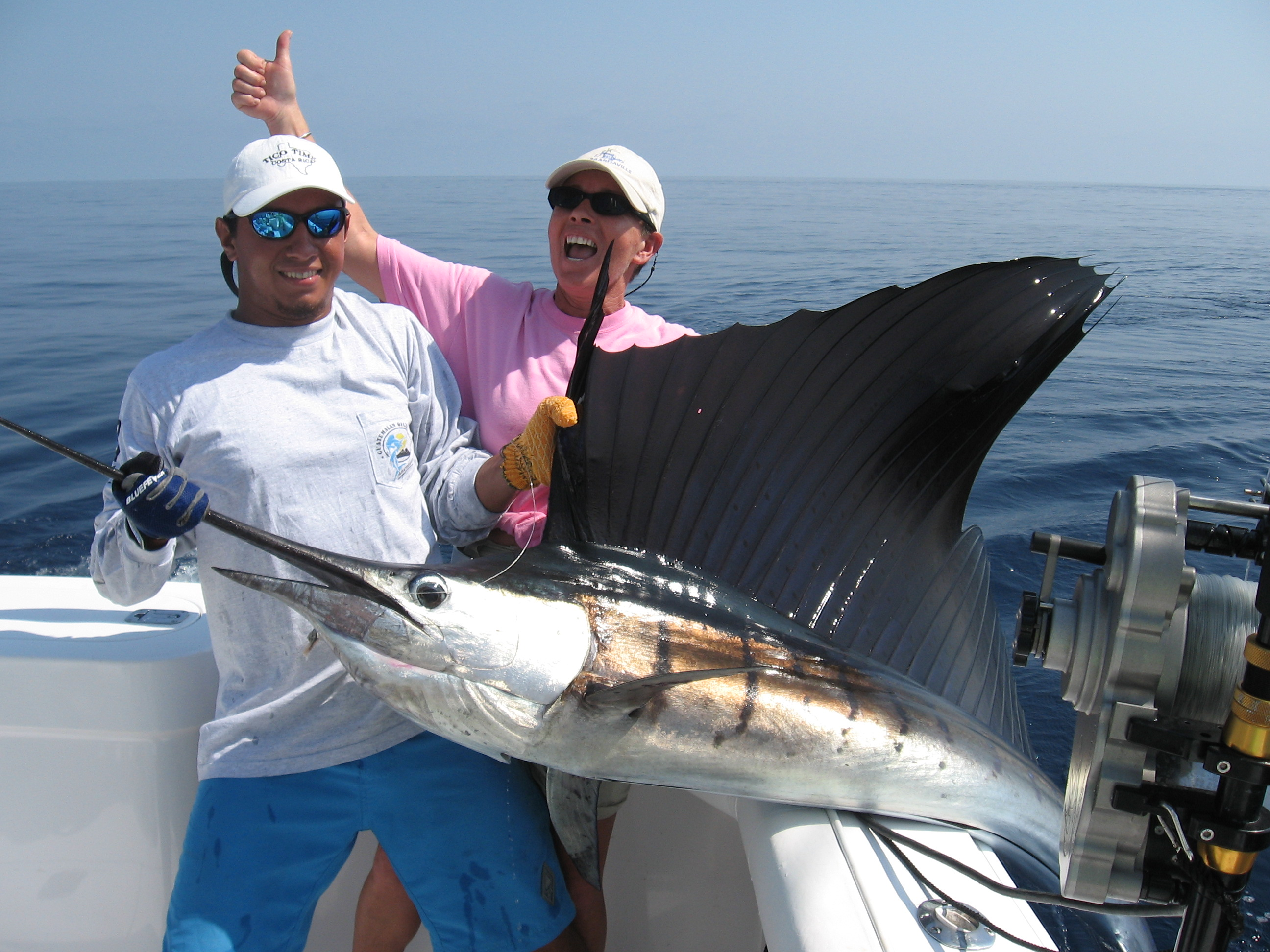
Recreational fishing

A wide variety of both terrestrial and aquatic non-human animals are hunted for sport.

The aquatic animals most often hunted for sport are fish, including many species from large marine predators such as sharks and tuna, to freshwater fish such as trout and carp.

Birds such as partridges, pheasants and ducks, and mammals such as deer and wild boar, are among the terrestrial game animals most often hunted for sport and for food.

== Symbolic uses ==
=== In art ===
Non-human animals, often mammals but including fish and insects among other groups, have been the subjects of art from the earliest times, both historical, as in Ancient Egypt, and prehistoric, as in the cave paintings at Lascaux and other sites in the Dordogne, France and elsewhere. Famous images of other animals include Albrecht Dürer's 1515 woodcut The Rhinoceros, and George Stubbs's c. 1762 horse portrait Whistlejacket.

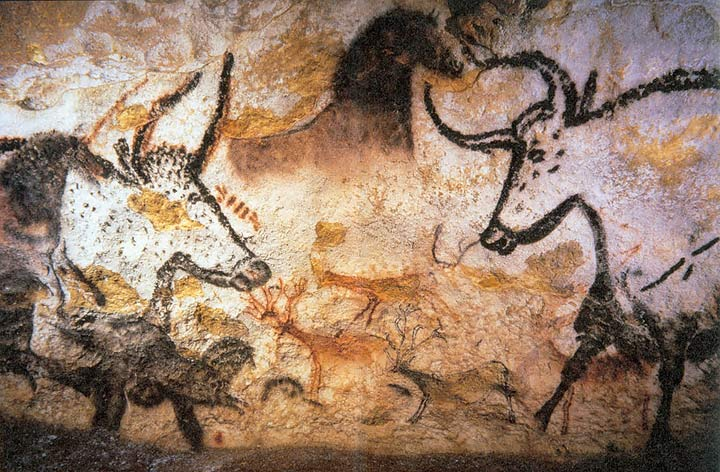
Upper Paleolithic cave painting of aurochs, horses and deer, Lascaux, c. 17,300 years old

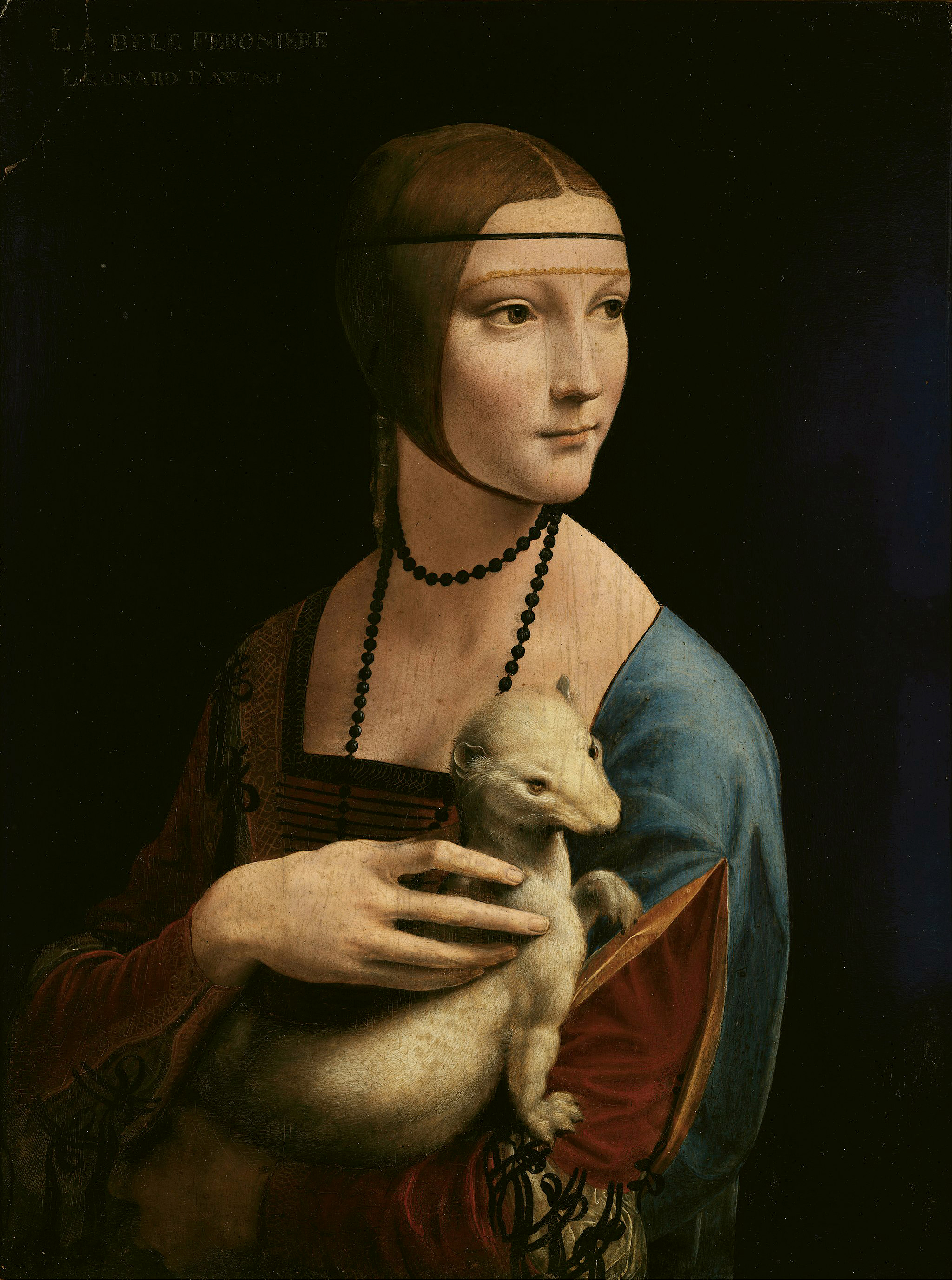
Leonardo da Vinci's The Lady with an Ermine, c. 1490

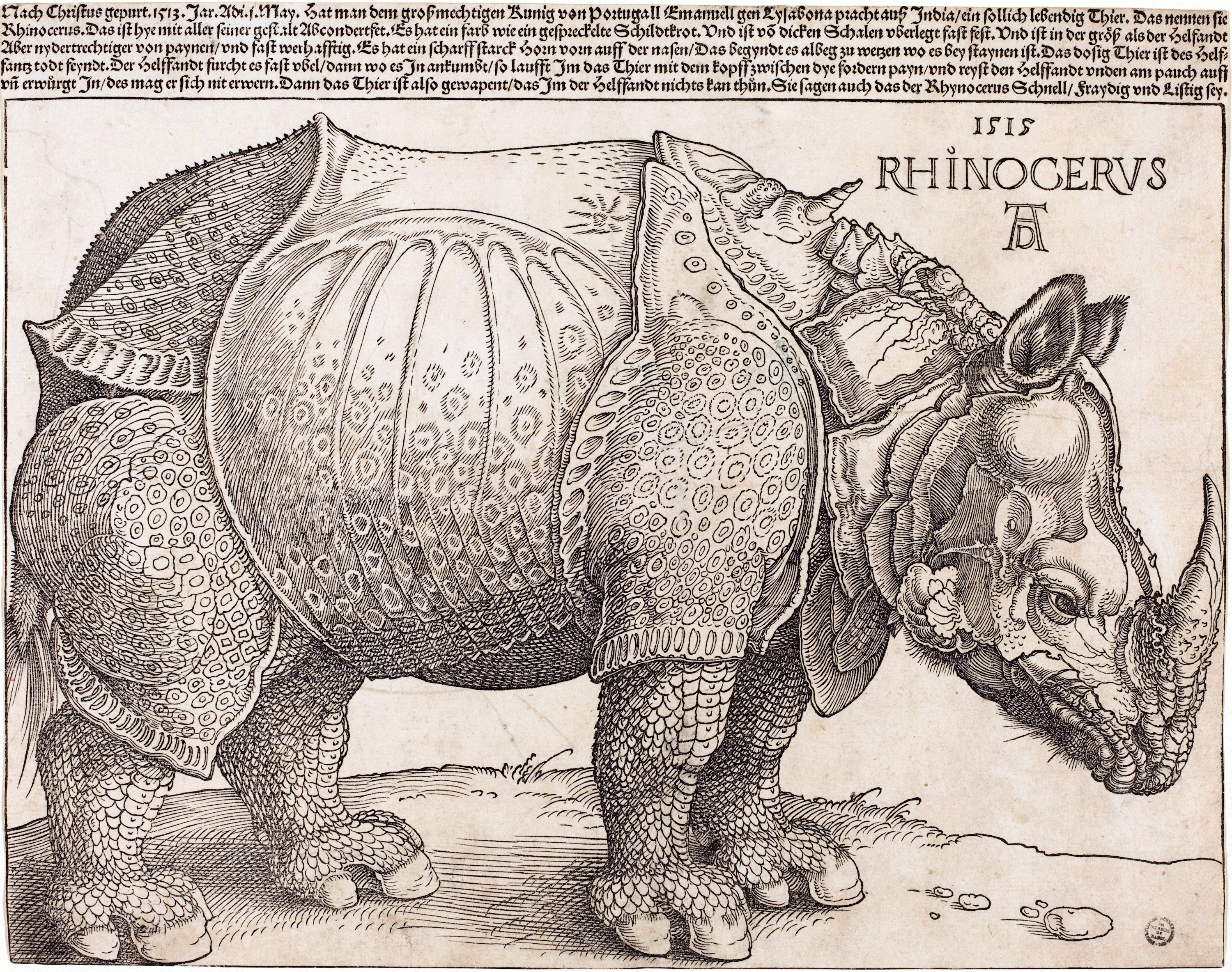
Albrecht Dürer's 1515 The Rhinoceros

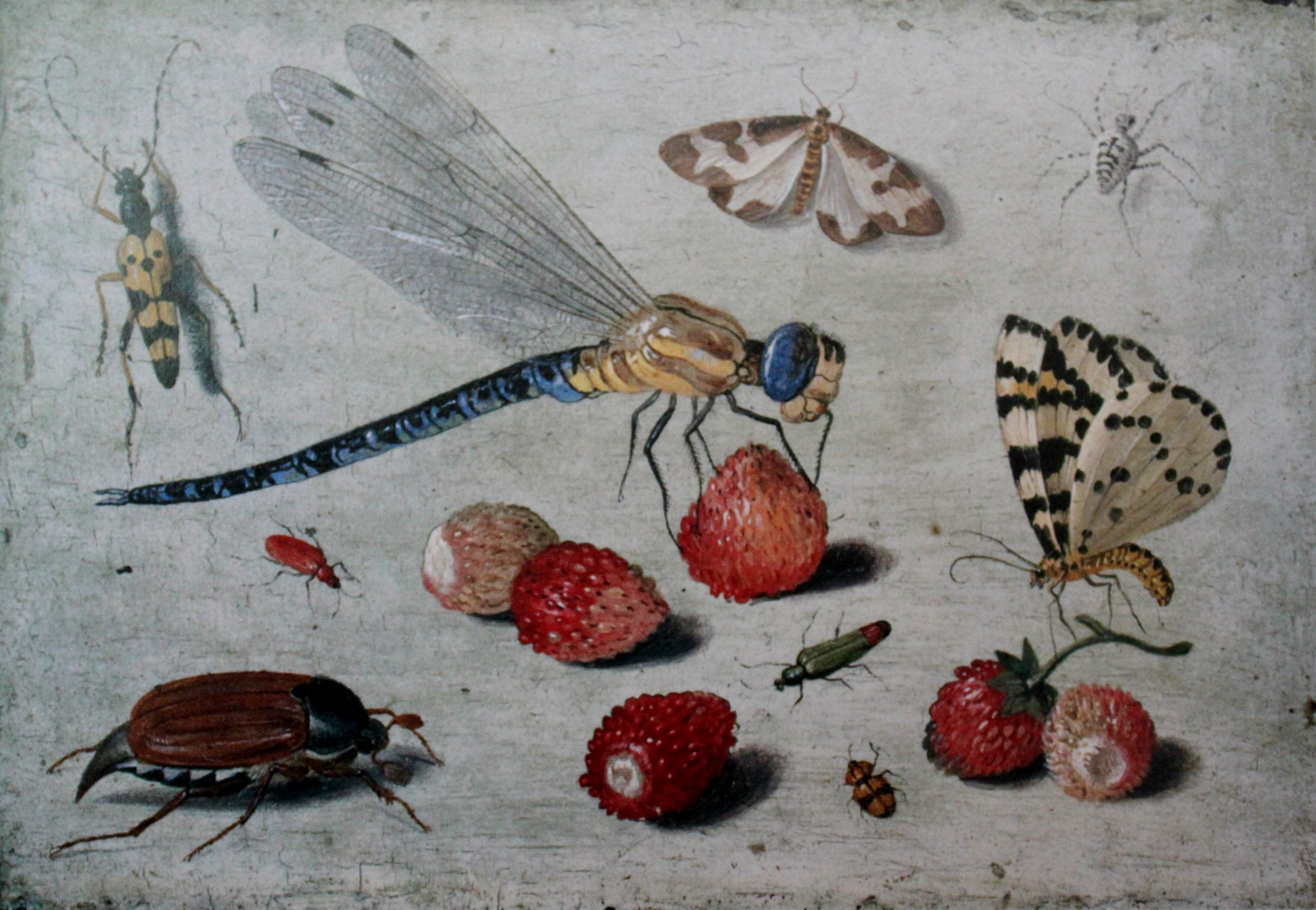
Jan van Kessel's A Dragon-fly, Two Moths, a Spider and Some Beetles, With Wild Strawberries, 17th century

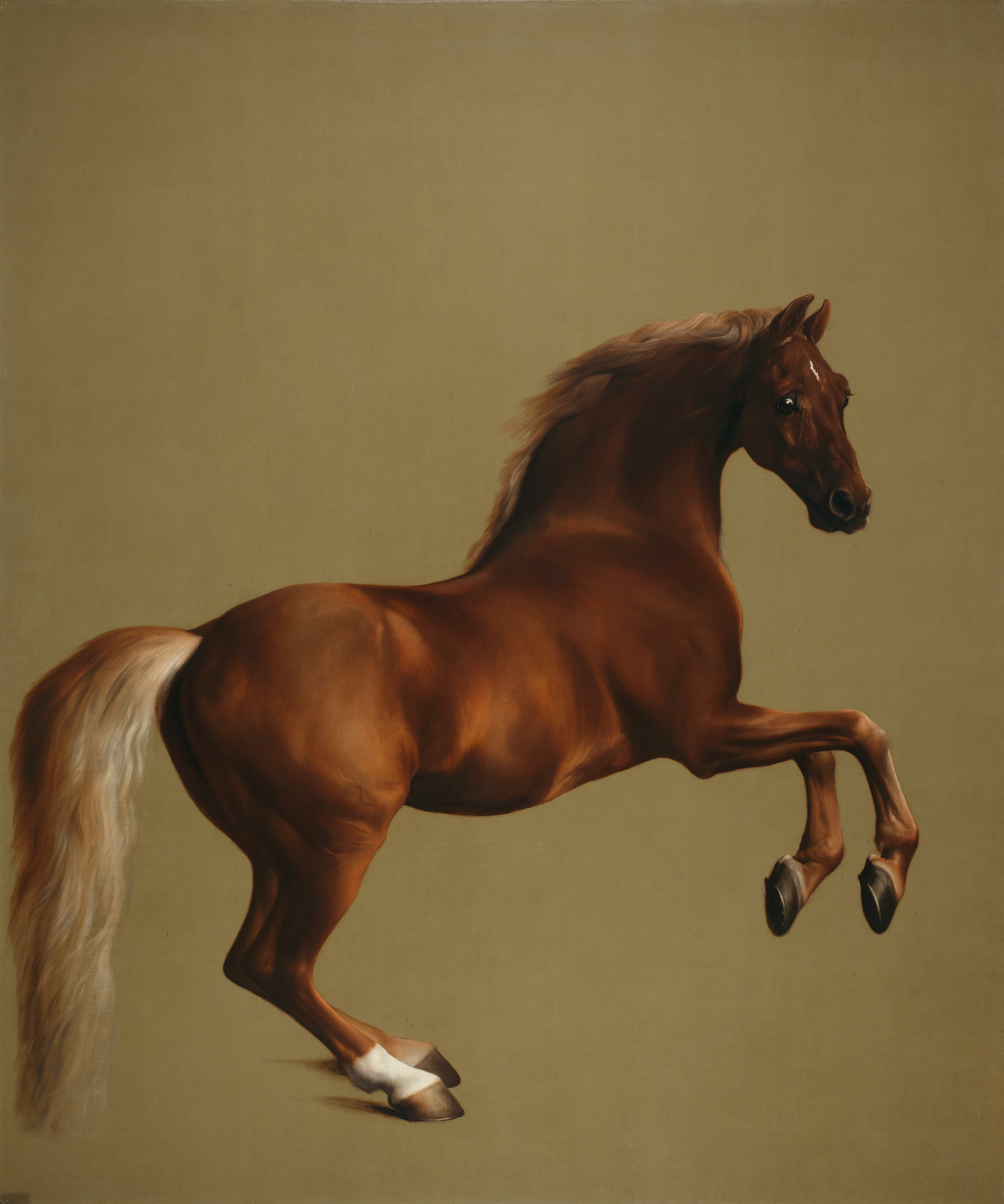
George Stubbs's c. 1762 Whistlejacket

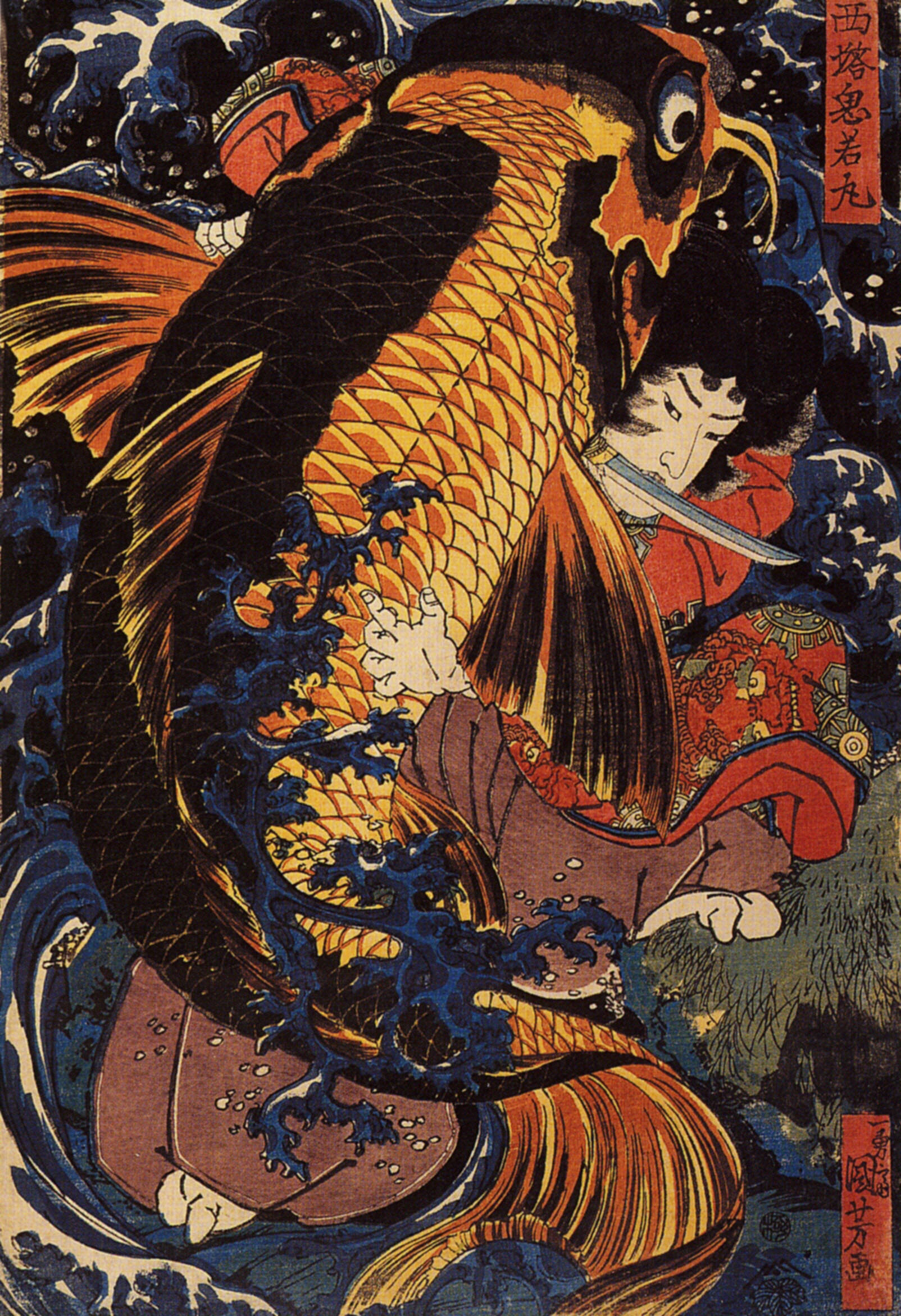
Utagawa Kuniyoshi's Saito Oniwakamaru fights a giant carp at the Bishimon waterfall, 19th century

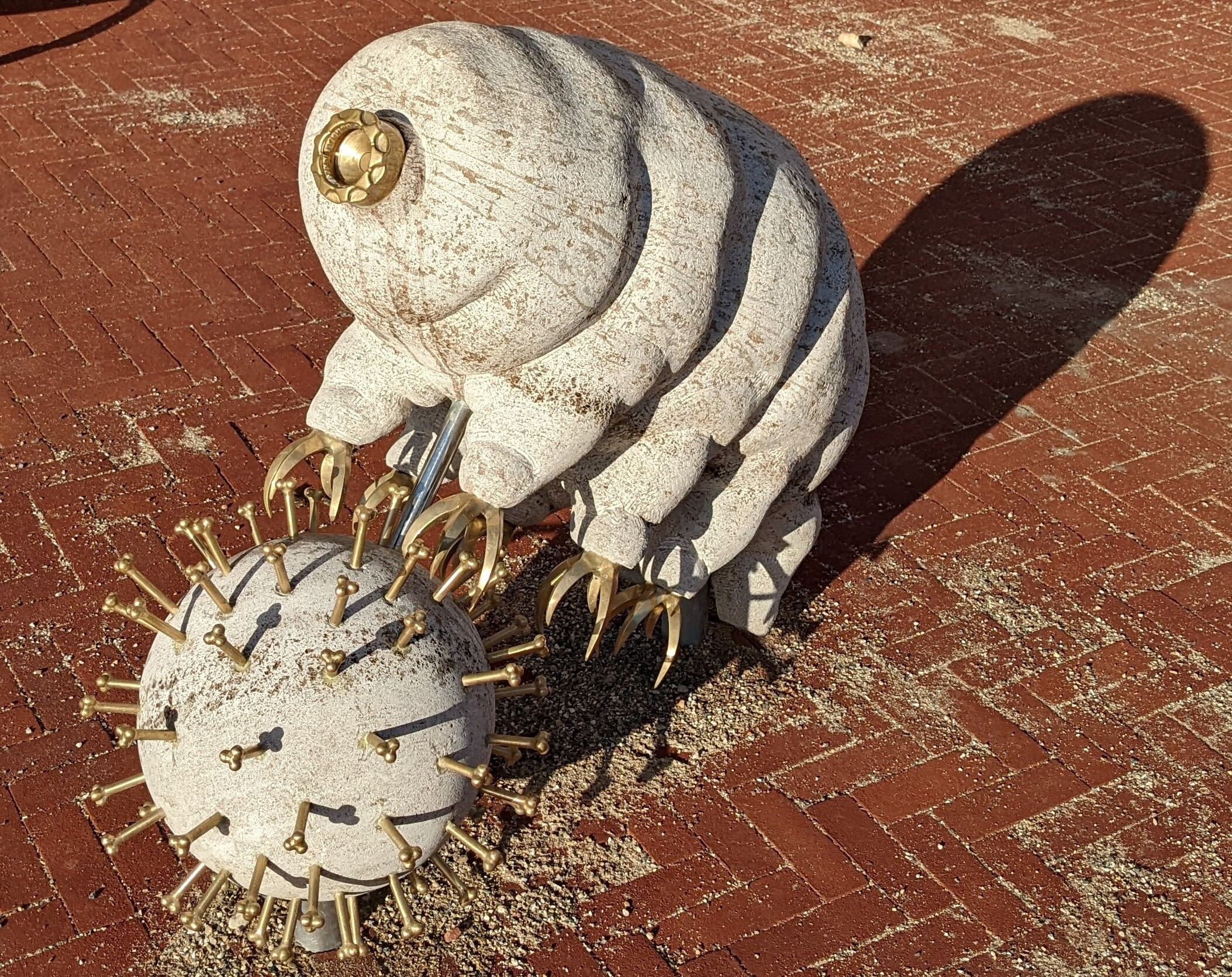
Sculpture of a tardigrade (and a coronavirus) by Arno Coenen, St Eusebius' Church, Arnhem, 21st century

=== In literature and film ===
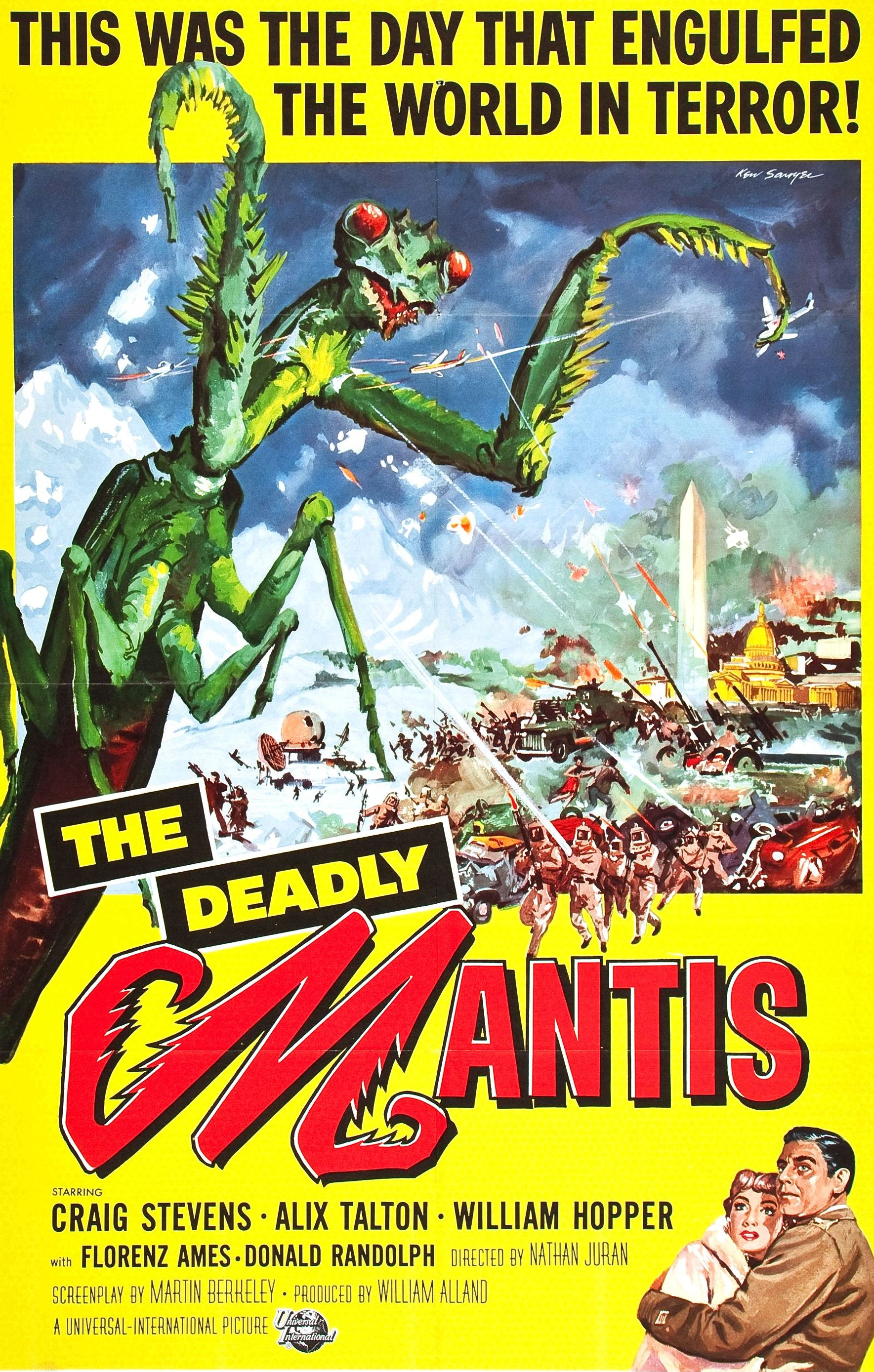
Poster for The Deadly Mantis, 1957

Animals as varied as bees, beetles, mice, foxes, crocodiles and elephants play a wide variety of roles in literature and film, from Aesop's Fables of the classical era to Rudyard Kipling's Just So Stories and Beatrix Potter's "little books" starting with the 1901 Tale of Peter Rabbit.

A genre of films, Big bug movies, has been based on oversized insects, including the pioneering 1954 Them!, featuring giant ants mutated by radiation, and the 1957 films The Deadly Mantis and Beginning of the End, this last complete with giant locusts and "atrocious" special effects.

Birds have occasionally featured in film, as in Alfred Hitchcock's 1963 The Birds, loosely based on Daphne du Maurier's story of the same name, which tells the tale of sudden attacks on humans by violent flocks of birds. Ken Loach's admired 1969 Kes, based on Barry Hines's 1968 novel A Kestrel for a Knave, tells a story of a boy coming of age by training a kestrel.

=== In video games ===
Animals feature in many different roles in video games, ranging from background NPCs and basic enemies to the protagonist of a game, as in the 2022 game Stray. Virtual pet video games, such as the Nintendogs series and the mobile game Neko Atsume, are types of games where the player cares for a fictional pet, usually a dog or cat. In 2019, a Twitter account named Can You Pet the Dog? was created to document whether the dog and the cat characters in a game can be petted.

=== In mythology and religion ===
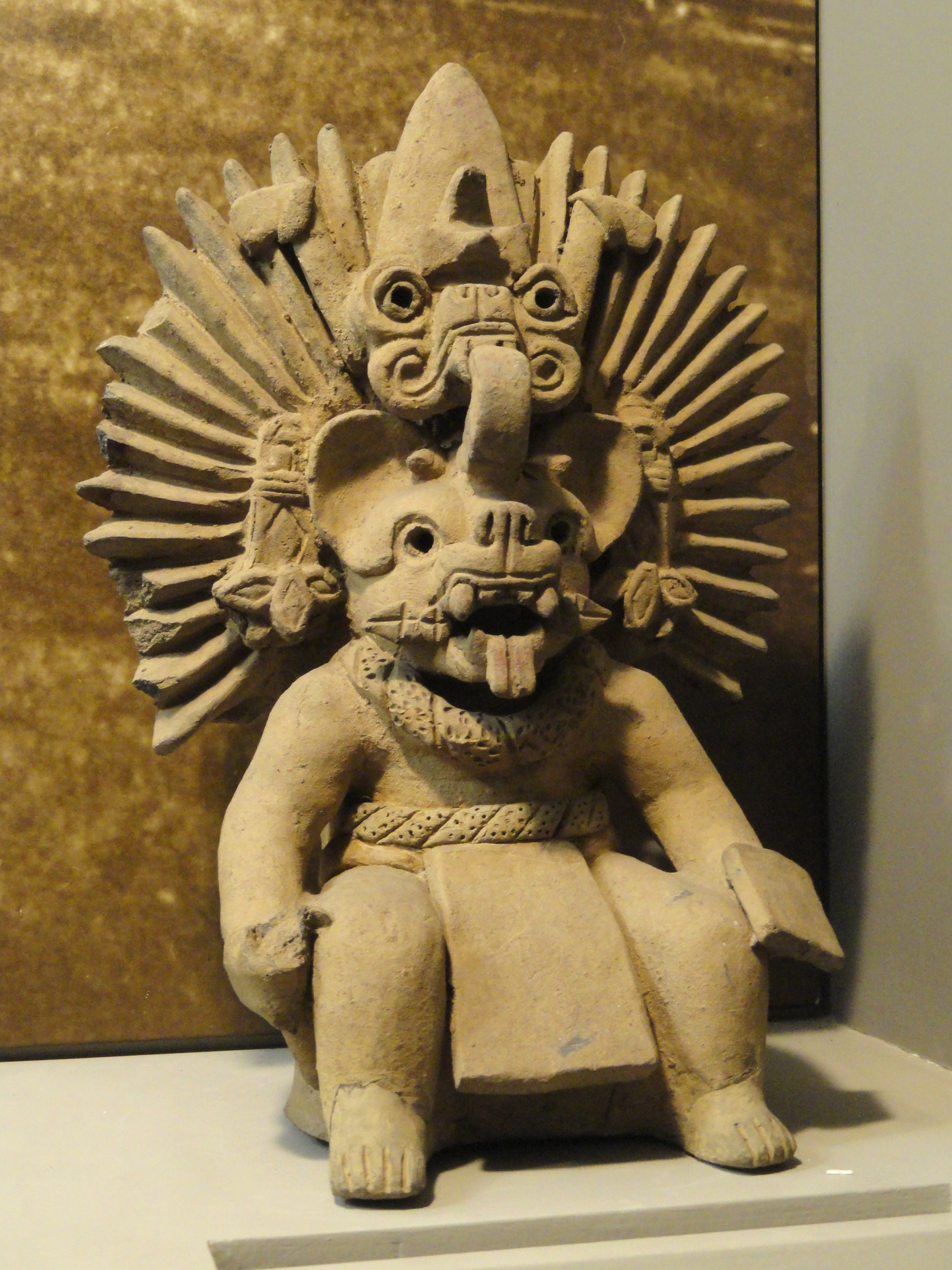
Zapotec bat god, Oaxaca, 350–500 CE

Animals including many insects and non-human mammals feature in mythology and religion.

Among the insects, in both Japan and Europe, as far back as ancient Greece and Rome, a butterfly was seen as the personification of a human's soul, both while they were alive and after their death. The scarab beetle was sacred in ancient Egypt, while the praying mantis was considered a god in southern African Khoi and San tradition for their praying posture.

Among the mammals, cattle, deer, horses, lions, bats bears, and wolves (including werewolves), are the subjects of myths and worship. Reptiles too, such as the crocodile, have been worshipped as gods in cultures including ancient Egypt and Hinduism.

Of the twelve signs of the Western zodiac, six, namely Aries (ram), Taurus (bull), Cancer (crab), Leo (lion), Scorpio (scorpion) and Pisces (fish) are animals, while two others, Sagittarius (horse/human) and Capricorn (fish/goat) are hybrid animals; the name zodiac indeed means a circle of animals. All twelve signs of the Chinese zodiac are animals.

In Christianity the Bible has a variety of animal symbols, the Lamb is a famous title of Jesus. In the New Testament the Gospels Mark, Luke and John have animal symbols: "Mark is a lion, Luke is a bull and John is an eagle".

== See also ==
- Animal–industrial complex
- Commodity status of animals
- Veganism
- World Animal Day
