= Barbara Noske =

Dutch philosopher and anthropologist

- Born: Bussum, Netherlands
- Education: MA in socio-cultural anthropology; PhD in philosophy
- Alma mater: University of Amsterdam
- Known for: Coining the term animal–industrial complex
- Scientific career
- Fields: Anthropology, Critical Animal Studies, Philosophy
- Institutions: York University; University of Sydney

Barbara Miriam Noske is a Dutch cultural anthropologist and philosopher. She introduced the concept animal–industrial complex in her 1989 book Humans and Other Animals.

== Academic career ==
Noske holds a MA in socio-cultural anthropology and a PhD in philosophy from the University of Amsterdam. In the 1990s, Noske taught environmental ethics, ecology and ecofeminism at York University in Toronto while a research fellow in the Faculty of Environmental Studies. She then worked as a research fellow at the Research Institute for Humanities and Social Sciences at the University of Sydney.

According to Anne Scott, Noske "was among the earliest feminist authors to raise the question of human relationships with other animals in a non-essentialist manner".

== Bibliography ==
- Huilen met de wolven: Een interdisciplinaire benadering van de mens-dier relatie. Unpublished thesis, 1988.
- Humans and Other Animals: Beyond the Boundaries of Anthropology, 1989.
- Beyond Boundaries: Humans and Animals (Black Rose Books, 1997)
- Al liftend: Uit het leven van een wereldreizigster, 2000.
- Thumbing It: A Hitchhiker's Ride to Wisdom, 2018.
