= Jessica Dempsey (ecologist) =

Canadian political ecologist

Jessica Dempsey is a Canadian political ecologist and a professor of geography at the University of British Columbia (UBC). Her research focuses on political explanations for the global failure to halt ecological problems including biodiversity loss, climate change, and climate-related social problems.

== Education and career ==
Dempsey has a bachelor's degree from the University of Victoria, and a master's degree and Ph.D. from UBC, completed in 2011 with funding from the Pierre Elliott Trudeau Foundation.

She became an assistant professor in the School of Environmental Studies at the University of Victoria, before returning to UBC as a faculty member in 2016.

== Book ==
Dempsey is the author of Enterprising Nature: Economics, Markets, and Finance in Global Biodiversity (Wiley, 2016). It received the 2018 James M. Blaut Outstanding Publication Award of the Cultural and Political Ecology Specialty Group of the Association of American Geographers.
