= Critical animal studies =

Interdisciplinary field and community

Critical animal studies (CAS) is an academic sub-discipline that critically examines human relationships with nonhuman animals, with a focus on social justice and animal liberation. Challenging the conventional anthropocentric views of humans toward animals, it recognizes the inherent value of nonhuman animals. It aims to create a more equitable and ethical relationship between humans and other animals. CAS applies critical theory to animal studies and animal ethics. It emerged in 2001 with the founding of the Centre for Animal Liberation Affairs by Anthony J. Nocella II and Steven Best, which in 2007 became the Institute for Critical Animal Studies (ICAS). The core interest of CAS is animal ethics, firmly grounded in trans-species intersectionality, environmental justice, social justice politics and critical analysis of the underlying role played by the capitalist system. Scholars in the field seek to integrate academic research with political engagement and activism.

== History ==
=== Background ===
CAS traces its history to critical social movements of the 1960s and 1970s, when ecological and animal questions entered the academic debate. This was also when the first animal liberation movements, Bands of Mercy, and Animal Liberation Front emerged. The institutional history began in 2001 when Steven Best and Anthony J. Nocella II established the Centre for Animal Liberation Affairs (CALA). Over the following years, CALA conducted research on issues related to animal exploitation, provided education and analysis, and advised on policy. Two major initiatives were the annual Animal Liberation Philosophy and Policy Conference and the founding of the Animal Liberation Philosophy and Policy Journal, later renamed the Journal for Critical Animal Studies. The name of the movement (CAS) emerged in 2006, as a consequence of long-term discussions among activists and scholars who collaborated with CALA. In April 2007, CALA changed its name to the Institute for Critical Animal Studies (ICAS).

=== ICAS ===
ICAS is a private organization run by a Board of Executive Directors, who are responsible for making major decisions concerning its mission, strategic plans, and principles. Since 2011, the institution has been part of an international network with branches in Europe, Asia, Africa, South America, and Oceania. It has since established a series of initiatives, such as the Students for Critical Animal Studies, the Intersectional Research Collective, the Annual Tilikum Awards, and the Revista Latinoamericana de Estudios Críticos Animales (Spanish Journal for Critical Animal Studies). In 2014, ICAS published a volume titled "Defining Critical Animal Studies: An Intersectional Social Justice Approach for Liberation" (co-edited by Anthony J. Nocella II, John Sorenson, Kim Socha, and Atsuko Matsuoka). The publication defines the basic aims and principles of the movement. ICAS also issues three journals—Journal for Critical Animal Studies, Peace Studies Journal, and Green Theory and Praxis.

== Ten principles ==
The principles guiding CAS's work were included in the article "Introducing Critical Animal Studies", published in the Journal of the Critical Animal Studies in 2007.

1. Interdisciplinarity: It supports the collaborative work of scholars from different fields, providing deeper, more comprehensive insight into human–animal relations.
2. Subjectivity: It questions the notion that academic analysis can be entirely objective, devoid of normative values and political commitments.
3. Theory-to-practice approach: It perceives theory as a starting point for political action and social commitment.
4. Intersectionality: It draws attention to common roots of many forms of oppression, such as speciesism, sexism, racism, and other violence-based ideologies, considered as components of global systems of domination.
5. Antihierarchical approach: It provides an anti-capitalist stance, aimed at democratization and decentralization of society.
6. Solidarity: It does not concentrate solely on animal issues. Instead, it aims at making alliances with other social movements devoted to the struggle against oppression.
7. Total liberation: It emphasizes the need for human, nonhuman, and Earth liberation and perceives them as a common struggle.
8. Deconstructing binaries: It undermines socially constructed oppositions, such as human–animal and nature–culture.
9. Radical politics: It supports all tactics promoting change used in social justice movements, such as economic sabotage and direct action.
10. Critical dialogue: It promotes constructive dialogue between diverse academic groups, activists, and individuals, the public, and non-profit sectors.

== Animal studies ==
There are significant differences between critical animal studies and animal studies. CAS is a more radical option, overtly underlining the need for political engagement and advocating direct action, which may be considered controversial in traditional academic circles. Supporters of CAS often emphasize that although animal studies have made a substantial contribution to growing awareness of the complexities of human–animal relations, they lack deep moral engagement and remain detached from the most significant problems. It is worth noting that the term "animal studies" encompasses diverse scholars and methodologies, some of which explicitly call for an ethical commitment.

According to Dinker and Pedersen, critical animal studies involve both a critical-analytic and an affirmative-transformative approach to animals and affect. One of the core purposes of the critical animal studies, according to them, is working against all forms of oppression and commodification by "breaking the silences normally surrounding the situation of animals in human society." Species-inclusive intersectionality education is a key dimension of critical animal studies, which identifies several ways in which speciesism intersects with other social justice issues such as racism, sexism, heterosexism, and ableism.

== See also ==
- Animal rights
- Animal–industrial complex
- Ecofeminism
- Engaged theory
- Veganarchism
