= David Olivier =

Anglo-French activist, writer, and philosopher (born 1956)

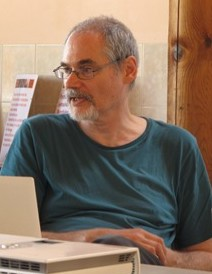
- Olivier in 2012
- Born: David Olivier; 11 March 1956 (age 70); London, England
- Occupations: Activist; writer; philosopher; computer programmer
- Years active: 1985–present
- Known for: Antispeciesist activism
- Spouse: Agnese Pignataro (m. 2008)
- Children: 2
- Website: david.olivier.name

David Olivier Whittier (born David Olivier; 11 March 1956) is an Anglo-French antispeciesist activist, writer, and philosopher. He was a founder of the French journal Cahiers antispécistes ("Antispeciesist Notebooks"), the annual event Veggie Pride, and the annual meeting Les Estivales de la question animale ("The Summers of the Animal Question"). He coined the term "veggiephobia" and has written on utilitarian, sentience-based, and antinaturalist ethics.

Born in London, Olivier moved to France in 1967. His early activism involved ecology, anarchism, anti-sexism, and anti-racism, before he became involved in animal rights in the mid-1980s. He studied physics at the École normale supérieure de Saint-Cloud and the University of Lyon 1, and worked as a computer programmer at the University of Lyon until his retirement in 2018.

Olivier has been described as one of the founding figures of the French antispeciesist movement. He translated works by Peter Singer and other English-language animal ethics writers into French, and influenced activists including Brigitte Gothière and Sébastien Arsac, later co-founders of L214. His writing has also addressed wild animal suffering, criticism of environmentalism, and the political framing of animal advocacy.

== Early life ==
Olivier was born in London on 11 March 1956 to a French-teaching father and an American mother who was a painter. He mainly lived in London until 1967, after which he mainly lived in France. From childhood, he objected to the killing of animals for food.

In adolescence, he became interested in ecology and then anarchism, and was involved in anti-sexist and anti-racist activism. In Lyon, he was active in the French family planning and gay liberation movements. From the mid-1980s, he focused increasingly on animal rights and moved away from anarchist and Marxist intellectual influences.

== Education and career ==
Olivier earned a baccalauréat scientifique in 1978. He studied physics at the former École normale supérieure de Saint-Cloud from 1976 to 1981, followed by a DEA in nuclear and particle physics at the University of Lyon 1 in 1988.

From 1983 to 1984, Olivier worked as a physics teacher but did not complete the CAPES certification year. Most of his professional career was spent as a computer programmer at the University of Lyon 3 and later at Lyon 2. He retired in March 2018.

== Antispeciesist activism ==
Olivier wrote a leaflet distributed in libertarian circles in Lyonnais from 1985, and has been described as one of the founding figures of the French antispeciesist movement. His meeting with Yves Bonnardel in 1986 introduced him to the animal liberation movement in the English-speaking world. With Bonnardel, Françoise Blanchon, and two other activists, he produced the pamphlet Nous ne mangeons pas de viande pour ne pas tuer d'animaux ("We Do Not Eat Meat So We Do Not Kill Animals"). Because he was bilingual, Olivier produced some of the first French translations of Peter Singer's works for other activists.

The focus on animal rights around the ethical concept of antispeciesism led Olivier, Bonnardel, and Blanchon to found the journal Cahiers antispécistes in 1989. For a long period, the journal was a main publication of the antispeciesist movement in France. Olivier wrote many of its articles and translated texts by Singer, Tom Regan, Paola Cavalieri, James Rachels, and Steve F. Sapontzis. The journal's founders influenced Sébastien Arsac and Brigitte Gothière, later founders of the animal protection organisation L214.

In October 2001, Olivier founded the first Veggie Pride in Paris. In its manifesto, he defined the term "veggiephobia". Veggie Pride was intended to bring together vegetarians and vegans who refused to eat animals and to denounce discrimination that they said they faced in social life, including in communal food, and in the defence of their ideas. The event was later held in several cities in France, Europe, and North America, and its 18th Paris event took place in 2018.

In 2002, Olivier organised the first meeting of Les Estivales de la question animale, an annual meeting for discussion of animal issues. The meeting included association leaders and theorists of the French-speaking animalist movement. It was associated with the launch of L214, the movement for the legal abolition of meat, and the creation of the Animalist Party in France.

In 2004, Olivier left the editorial staff of Cahiers antispécistes after the publication of issue 23. In 2018, Presses Universitaires de France published La Révolution antispéciste, which included several of Olivier's articles. Thierry Jacquet wrote in Le Temps that the book showed that the animal question was being taken more seriously in French-language debate.

== Philosophy ==
Olivier opposes speciesism, which he defines as "a discrimination based upon species, nearly always in favour of the members of the human species, Homo sapiens". He also argues that species do not exist as objective entities, and that the concept is essentialist and should be rejected in a similar way to racial categories in humans.

Olivier is a utilitarian. He argues that "the sole relevant criterion for taking into account the interests of a being is its being sentient and thus having interests". He defines ethics as the study of the right answer to the question "what to do?", with attention to the consequences of actions for the sentient beings affected. Olivier has also described himself as a hedonistic utilitarian, holding that sensations have moral value, positive for happiness and negative for unhappiness, independently of other characteristics of the being experiencing them.

Olivier is an antinaturalist, arguing that nature does not exist as a normative authority and has no reason to determine human ethical decisions. He has argued that the naturalisation of animals contributes to their domination. His antinaturalism is associated with his support for interventions to reduce wild animal suffering, and with his criticism of environmentalism. His views have been discussed by critics of antispeciesism. Olivier identifies as progressive, arguing that progress in the state of the world is possible, while rejecting the idea that it can be achieved through a single revolutionary rupture.

== Personal life ==
Olivier is an atheist. In 2008, he married Agnese Pignataro. They have two children, Arthur, born in 2009, and Emil, born in 2015. In June 2020, Olivier was diagnosed with autism. In 2023, he legally added his mother's maiden name, Whittier, to his full name.

Olivier lives in France, in the Isère department.

== Publications ==
=== Articles in books ===
In Luc Ferry ou le rétablissement de l'ordre (Tahin Party, 2002):

- "Luc Ferry or restoration of order" (Cahiers antispécistes, no. 5, December 1992); Italian translation published in Etica & Animali, a.VI, no. 1–2, 1993.
- "Strange Drive" (Cahiers antispécistes, no. 10, September 1994).

In Espèces et Éthique - Darwin: une (r)évolution à venir (Tahin Party, 2001):

- "Nature does not choose" (Cahiers antispécistes, no. 14, December 1996).
- "The species either do not exist" (Cahiers antispécistes, no. 11, December 1994).
- "Richard Dawkins' Selfless Selfishness".

In La Révolution antispéciste (PUF, 2018):

- "What is speciesism?" (Informations et Réflexions libertaires, April 1991; Cahiers antispécistes, no. 5, December 1992).
- "Towards a non-naturalist ecology?" (Cahiers antispécistes, no. 17, December 1999).
- "The species either do not exist" (Cahiers antispécistes, no. 11, December 1994).
- "On superiority".

=== Pamphlets ===
- Nous ne mangeons pas de viande pour ne pas tuer d'animaux ("We Do Not Eat Meat So We Do Not Kill Animals"; 1989)

=== Other articles ===
- "Pourquoi je ne suis pas écologiste" ("Why I am not an environmentalist"; Cahiers antispécistes, no. 7, 1993).
- "Veggie Pride Manifesto" (2001).
- "Réflexions sur la Veggie Pride" ("Reflections on Veggie Pride"; Cahiers antispécistes, no. 21, 2002).
- "Refonder le progressisme" ("Refounding Progressivism"; interview by Martin Gibert, Versus, no. 2, 2015).
- With Estiva Reus, "La science et la négation de la conscience animale. De l'importance du problème matière-esprit pour la cause animale" (Cahiers antispécistes, no. 26, 2005), published in English as "Mind-Matter for Animals Matters: Science and the Denial of Animal Consciousness" in Between the Species, vol. 13, 2011.

== See also ==
- List of animal rights advocates
