= Yves Bonnardel =

French activist and philosopher (born 1967)

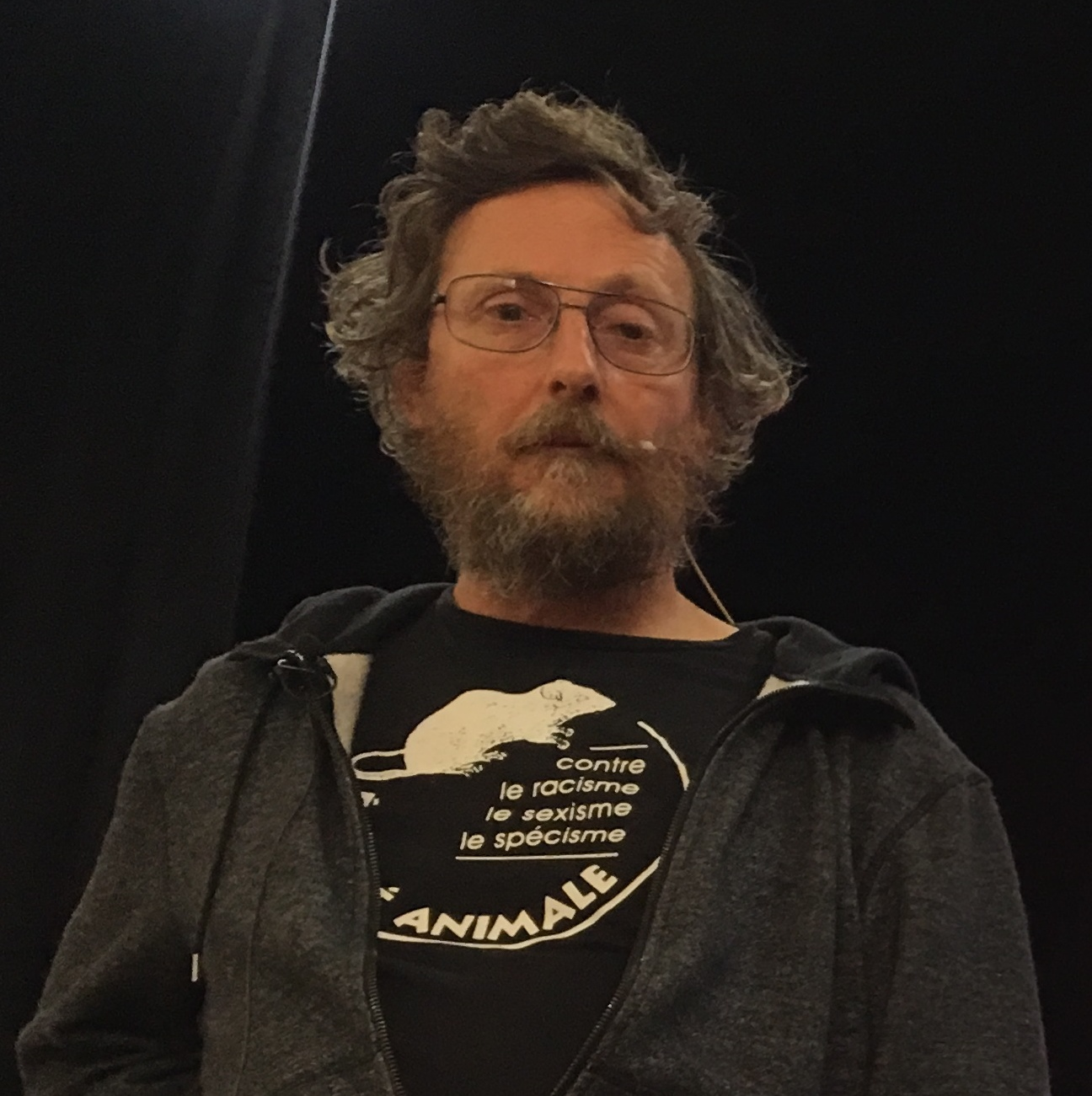
- Bonnardel in 2017
- Born: 1967 (age 58–59); Lyon, France
- Occupations: Activist; philosopher; writer; editor
- Website: yves-bonnardel.info

Yves Bonnardel (born 1967) is a French activist, philosopher, writer, and editor. He is associated with antispeciesism, libertarianism and egalitarianism. Bonnardel was one of the founding members of the French journal Cahiers antispécistes ("Antispeciesist Notebooks") and of the events Veggie Pride, Les Estivales de la question animale ("The Summers of the Animal Question") and the march to close all slaughterhouses.

== Life and career ==
Bonnardel was born in 1967 in a small town south of Lyon. His father was a secondary school teacher who was involved in the French Maoist movement. Bonnardel became a vegetarian at the age of 13. According to Fabien Carrié, his father's political engagement led Bonnardel to take a different path, turning to individualist anarchism and leaving school early with the intention of living in a community and training before becoming involved in activist causes. He became active against adult supremacy before also taking up antispeciesism.

In May 1989, with David Olivier and three other activists, Bonnardel published Nous ne mangeons pas de viande pour ne pas tuer d'animaux ("We Do Not Eat Meat So We Do Not Kill Animals"), in response to discussions of vegetarianism in France. In 1991, together with Olivier and Françoise Blanchon, he founded the antispeciesist journal Cahiers antispécistes lyonnais, later renamed Cahiers antispécistes. He was one of the journal's editors before leaving during the 1990s. In 1997, he co-wrote and distributed the Manifesto for the Abolition of International Apartheid with Olivier.

Bonnardel co-founded Veggie Pride in 2001. He is an editor of the antispeciesist French-language journal L'Amorce ("The Primer").

== Philosophy ==
Bonnardel is an antinaturalist and critic of the concept of nature. In an interview with Usbek&Rica, he described nature as an "ideological tool" that, in his view, presents humans as free while presenting other animals as bound to natural cycles such as the food chain. He argued that animals are treated as if they exist to perform ecosystem functions, such as a rabbit serving as food for a wolf. He compared this with religious ideas of women existing for men, or slaves for masters, and argued that individual animals have an interest in living. He also criticised the idea of a balance of nature, saying that "[w]hat we call balance, or order, in practice, it's chaos, it's nonsense". Bonnardel has discussed the predation problem and has argued that humans should work towards addressing it.

Bonnardel is critical of humanism, which he has described as a form of elitism centred on white men. He has argued instead for egalitarianism. He is a hedonistic utilitarian and argues that sentient individuals should be placed at the centre of moral concern because they have desires, perceptions, emotions and a will of their own. From this, he argues for the moral axiom that "[o]ne must not harm a sentient being". Bonnardel was influenced by Peter Singer's Animal Liberation. He supports Singer's conception of speciesism, which he regards as useful for criticising anthropocentric morality.

== Publications ==
=== Books ===
- La Domination adulte. L'oppression des mineurs ("Adult Domination. The Oppression of Minors"; Le Hêtre-Myriadis, 2015)
- with Thomas Lepeltier, Pierre Sigler (dir.), David Olivier and Estiva Reus. La Révolution antispéciste ("The Antispeciesist Revolution"; PUF, 2018)
- with Axelle Playoust-Braure. Solidarité animale. Défaire la société spéciste ("Animal Solidarity: Defeating the Speciesist Society"; ed. La Découverte, 2020)

=== Pamphlets ===
- Doing away with the concept of Nature, back to ethics and politics (Tahin Party, 2007)
