= March to close all slaughterhouses =

International event

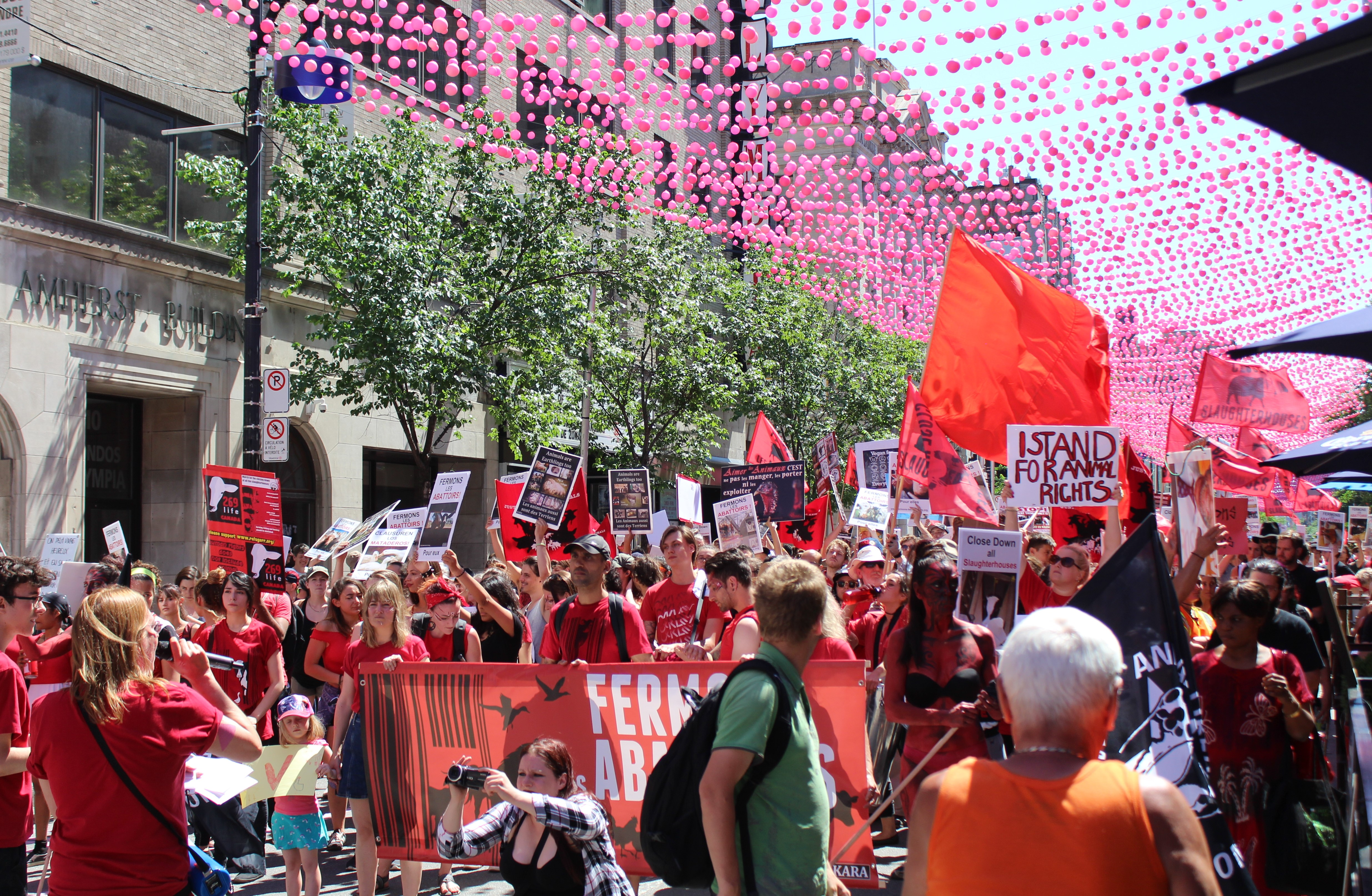
- Montreal march to close all slaughterhouses in 2016
- Status: Active
- Frequency: Annually
- Location: International
- Years active: 14
- Inaugurated: June 2, 2012
- Website: stopabattoirs.org

The march to close all slaughterhouses is an international event in the form of annual demonstrations in support of the abolition of the meat, dairy, egg, and fish industries and their practices, including the breeding, fishing, and killing of animals for food products.

== History ==
Initiated by the French animal rights organization L214, the first marches took place in Paris and Castres, in southern France on June 2, 2012. In Paris, the march commenced at the old Vaugirard Slaughterhouses, the site where Georges Franju filmed part of his documentary Le sang des bêtes. According to the organizers, the event has grown into an international movement with 35 participating cities in 16 countries in North and South America, Europe, Australia, and Asia in 2018; the Paris march of 2018 drew 3500 participants.

== Aims and vision ==
The event aims to raise awareness of the suffering of animals in slaughterhouses and to engage the public in dialogue about the ethical, environmental, and human health concerns related to animal-based products, slaughterhouse work, and animal agriculture. Supporters of the cause argue that the ban of slaughterhouses is a legitimate political project, based on the arguments that the production of animal products is harmful directly or indirectly to humans and animals, animal products are unnecessary for human health and that many members of the general population oppose the unnecessary suffering and killing of sentient animals.

== Locations ==
In 2018, the event was held in Canada, France, Australia, Argentina, Ireland, Turkey, Japan, and the United States.

== Criticism ==
Members of the meat industry in France have labelled the methods used by animal rights organizations such as L214 as "fascistic".

== See also ==
- Animal rights movement
- Social movement
- Speciesism
- Veganism
