= Antinaturalism (politics) =

Opposition to essentialist appeals to nature

Antinaturalism, or anti-naturalism, is opposition to essentialist appeals to nature or natural order. In political and ethical contexts, the term has been used in relation to antispeciesism, anti-racism, feminism and transhumanism.

Antinaturalist arguments have been associated with parts of the French animal rights movement and materialist feminism. The term is also used in xenofeminism, whose advocates argue that social and biological conditions should not be treated as fixed simply because they are described as natural. Writers associated with antinaturalist arguments include David Olivier and Yves Bonnardel.

== Views ==
Antinaturalist writers have criticised appeals to nature in debates about abortion, birth control, body modification, sex reassignment surgery and other forms of bodily autonomy.

In animal ethics, antinaturalist arguments have been contrasted with forms of radical environmentalism that treat nature as sacred or as valuable for its own sake. Catherine-Marie Dubreuil describes antinaturalist antispeciesism as rejecting the idea that nature as a whole has inherent sacred value, while treating ecological preservation as important insofar as it affects the well-being of sentient beings.

Yves Bonnardel argues that naturalist ideology can legitimise speciesist oppression of non-human sentient beings. He has also criticised the use of natural law arguments to justify the reintroduction of predatory animals to control populations of other animals, describing this as a form of speciesism.

== See also ==
- Animal welfare and rights in France – Treatment of and laws concerning non-human animals in France
- Appeal to nature – Rhetorical tactic and potential fallacy
- Bioconservatism – Cautious stance towards modifying human nature
- Culturalism – Central importance of culture as an organizing force in human affairs
- Ecocentrism – Stance of environmentalism that values should be centered around nature, not humanity
- Gender essentialism – Attribution of intrinsic qualities to genders
- Morphological freedom – Proposed civil right
- Naturalistic fallacy – Purported fallacy in explaining good reductively
- Predation problem – Ethical debate over predation
- Sentientism – Ethical philosophy centered on sentience
- Wild animal suffering – Suffering of wild animals due to natural processes
