= Hélène Thouy =

French politician

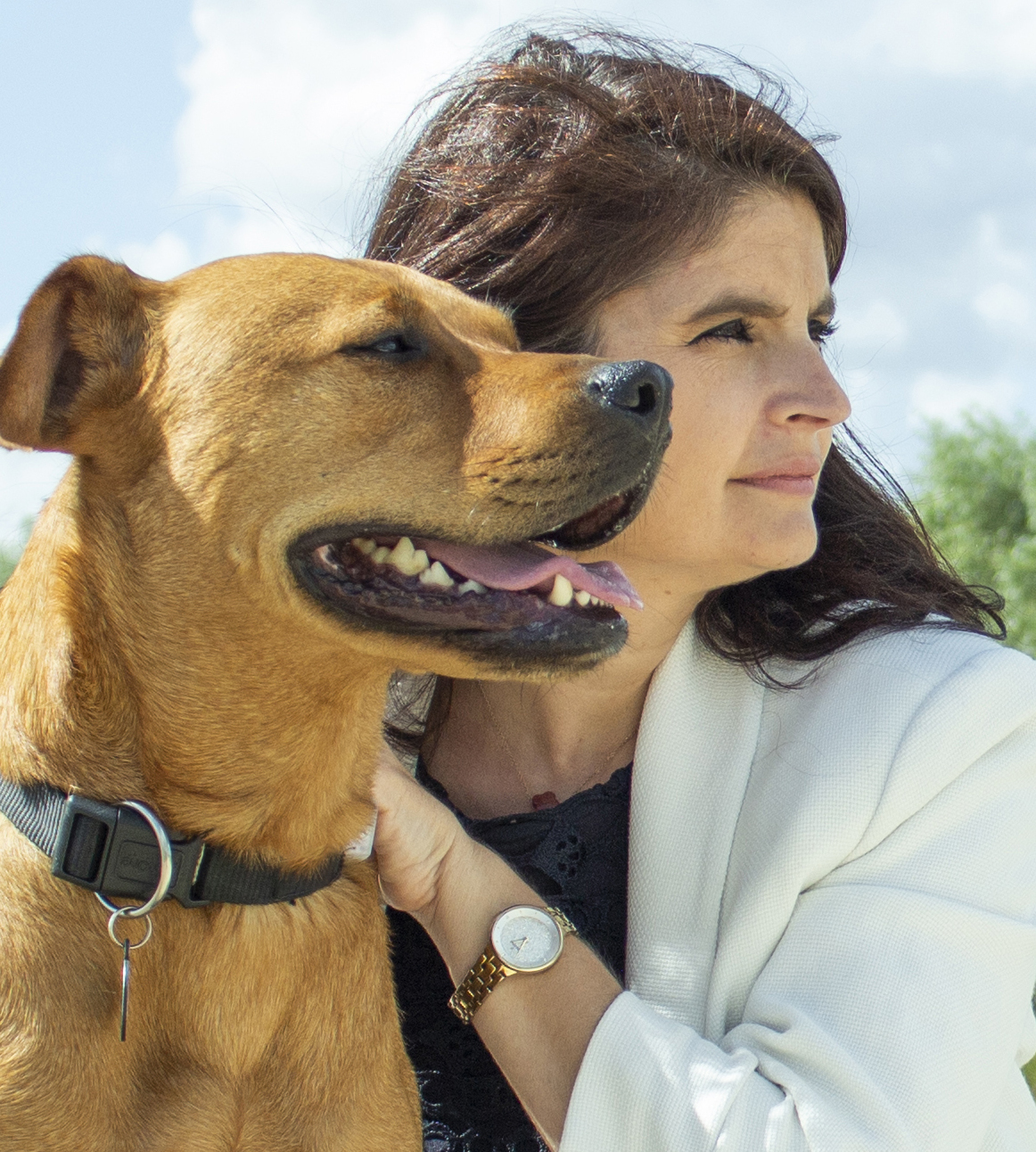
- Hélène Thouy

Personal details
- Born: 23 December 1983 (age 42) Marseille, France
- Party: Animalist Party
- Profession: Lawyer

Hélène Thouy (French pronunciation: [elɛn twi]; born 23 December 1983) is a French lawyer who co-founded the Animalist Party (French: Parti animaliste).

She unsuccessfully attempted to gain a place on the 2022 French presidential election ballot.

== Early life and career ==
After taking her oath as a lawyer, Thouy enrolled at the bar of Bordeaux.

Since 2010, she has been serving as a lawyer of the French animal rights organization L214 that documents and covers the conditions of livestock farming, fishing, hunting, animals' transportation and slaughter.

Thouy co-presides the Animalist Party she co-founded in 2016.

== Political campaigns ==
=== 2017 French legislative election ===
Thouy took part in the 2017 French legislative election and won 0.96 percent of the votes in the Gironde's 2nd constituency.

=== 2019 European parliament election ===
Thouy was head of the Animalist Party's list in the 2019 European Parliament election in France and won 2.16 percent of the votes.

When asked about animal rights after the outcomes, French President Emmanuel Macron agreed that "it is a cause which is important for our citizens, in particular young people, but not only them, because we have all come to realize we live among the living". Thouy declared that "it is great to talk about it, and make promises, but now we need concrete measures".

=== 2022 French presidential election ===
In July 2021, Thouy announced her candidacy in the 2022 French presidential election, declaring that "to be French is to be audacious. Believe me, you must be audacious to launch a political party which fights for beings that can never vote for it". Her objective was to defend animal rights and to make it a major theme of the next presidency.

Candidates need 500 signatures from elected officials to take part in the presidential run. Thouy did not meet the requirements.
