= Cahiers antispécistes =

French animal ethics journal (1991–2019)

- Cover of the first issue
- Discipline: Animal ethics
- Language: French

Publication details
- Former name: Cahiers antispécistes lyonnais
- History: 1991–2019
- Frequency: Irregular (initially quarterly)
- Open access: Yes

Standard abbreviations
- ISO 4: Cah. Antispécistes

Indexing
- ISSN: 1162-2709

Links
- Journal homepage

Cahiers antispécistes ("Antispeciesist notebooks"), originally titled Cahiers antispécistes lyonnais ("Lyon antispeciesist notebooks"), was a French-language journal devoted to antispeciesism, animal ethics and the animal liberation movement. Founded in 1991 by David Olivier, Yves Bonnardel and Françoise Blanchon, it published original essays, translations, interviews and discussions of animal advocacy. Initially published quarterly, it subsequently appeared at irregular intervals. Its final issue, number 43, appeared in August 2019.

== History ==
In May 1989, David Olivier, Yves Bonnardel and three other French activists published the pamphlet Nous ne mangeons pas de viande pour ne pas tuer d'animaux ("We don't eat meat so we don't kill animals"), responding to debates about vegetarianism within the French animal protection movement. The activists subsequently contacted Paola Cavalieri, an Italian philosopher involved in the publication of Etica & Animali, about establishing a journal in France.

Olivier, Bonnardel and Françoise Blanchon founded Cahiers antispécistes lyonnais in September 1991. The founders were among the early proponents of antispeciesism in France. According to the journal's retrospective account, its founding editors intended to challenge speciesism and examine the scientific, cultural and political implications of rejecting discrimination based on species.

The original plan was to establish similar journals in other French cities. When this did not occur, the word lyonnais ("Lyonnais") was removed from the title with issue 10 in September 1994. The journal initially carried the subtitle revue de lutte pour la libération animale ("journal of the struggle for animal liberation"). From September 1994, this became réflexion et action pour la libération animale ("reflection and action for animal liberation"), and in 1998 it adopted réflexion et action pour l'égalité animale ("reflection and action for animal equality").

The journal maintained a quarterly schedule through January 1994, after which publication became irregular. Initially available only in print, it subsequently published articles online as well. Beginning with issue 39 in 2017, it was published exclusively in digital form. All 43 numbered issues remain available on its website.

The editorial collective changed throughout the journal's history. Olivier was an editor from 1991 to 2004, Blanchon from 1991 to 1996, and Bonnardel until an uncertain date in the 1990s. Brigitte Gothière and Estiva Reus joined the editorial collective in 1998 and remained members until 2019. Other editors included Sébastien Arsac, Laurent Dervaux, Anne Renon, Antoine Comiti, Dominic Hofbauer, Marceline Pauly and Pierre Sigler.

The journal ceased publication in 2019. Its website was retained as an archive of the published issues and articles.

== Content ==
Cahiers antispécistes published philosophical and political writing on the treatment of non-human animals. Its early issues introduced French-speaking readers to arguments developed in the English-language animal liberation and animal rights movements, including translated works and commentaries by Tom Regan and Peter Singer. It also published interviews with activists and contributions on the strategies of the animal liberation movement.

Political scientist Christophe Traïni describes the publication and discussion of antispeciesist writing as an activist undertaking in its own right, intended to develop arguments for animal liberation. The journal also published criticism of the use of biological species classifications to justify distinctions in moral consideration between humans and other animals.

Over time, its subject matter expanded to include research from psychology, sociology, political philosophy, ethology and other disciplines. Later issues addressed subjects such as animal sentience, advocacy strategies, wild animal suffering, ethical carnivorism and effective altruism. The journal also published book reviews, personal accounts, poetry and debates about animal protection campaigns.

== Anthology ==
La révolution antispéciste ("The antispeciesist revolution"), an anthology of essays edited by Yves Bonnardel, Thomas Lepeltier and Pierre Sigler, was published by the Presses Universitaires de France in 2018. It brought together texts originally published in Cahiers antispécistes, alongside other previously published and new contributions.

In his preface, philosopher Renan Larue described the anthology as a recognition of writers whose work on antispeciesism had largely developed outside academic institutions and had frequently received little attention from them.
