= Animalist Party =

French animal advocacy party

Animalist Party Parti animaliste
- President: Hélène Thouy
- Founded: 14 March 2016
- Headquarters: Vénissieux
- Membership (2017): 2,000
- Ideology: Animal welfare Animal rights
- Political position: Left-wing
- European political alliance: Animal Politics EU
- Colours: Violet

Website
- parti-animaliste.fr

The Animalist Party (French: Parti animaliste) is a French political party focused on animal rights and against cruelty to animals.

== History ==
For the 2022 French legislative election, the party presented 421 candidates in the first round of this election, with the primary objective not of obtaining seats but of highlighting the theme of the animal cause in France.

== Election results ==
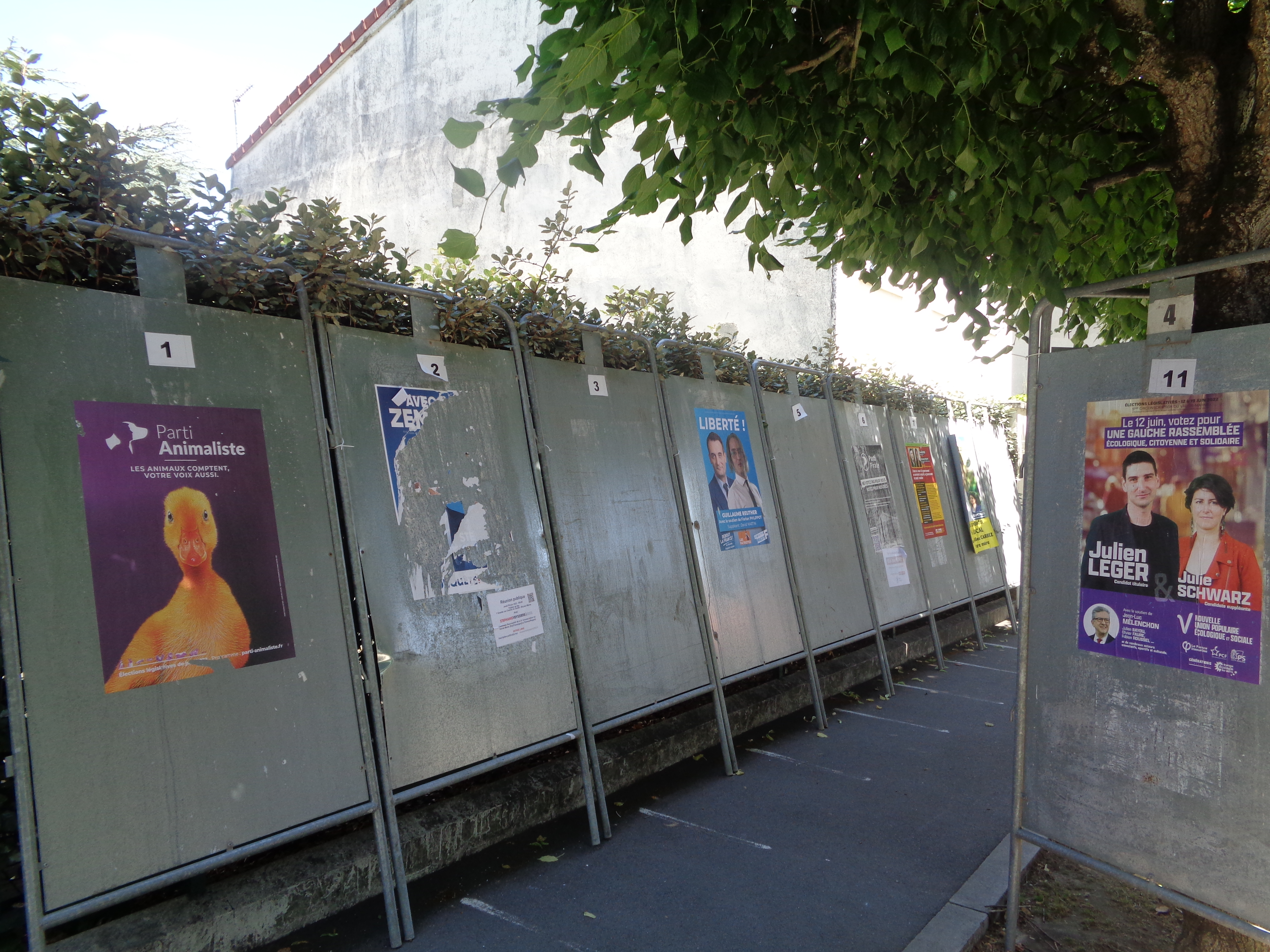
Animalist Party (left of image) campaign poster for the 2022 French legislative election in Val-de-Marne's 5th constituency

=== National Assembly ===
Election year	Votes	%	Seats	+/−
2017	63,637	0.28	0 / 577	Steady
2022	255 712	1.12	0 / 577	Steady

Any vote received brings in 1,42 € per year for the five years of the mandate. With its 63,637 votes, the animalist party has thus benefited from a total of 45,000 € in subsidies for the last five years. The money earned in 2022 is expected to be much higher.

=== European Parliament ===
Election	Leader	Votes	%	Seats	+/−	EP Group
2019	Hélène Thouy	490,074	2.16 (#11)	0 / 79	New	−
2024	Hélène Thouy	494,356	2.01 (#10)	0 / 81	0	−

== See also ==
- Animal welfare and rights in France
- Ecological Revolution for the Living
- List of animal advocacy parties
