= David Sztybel =

Canadian philosopher (born 1967)

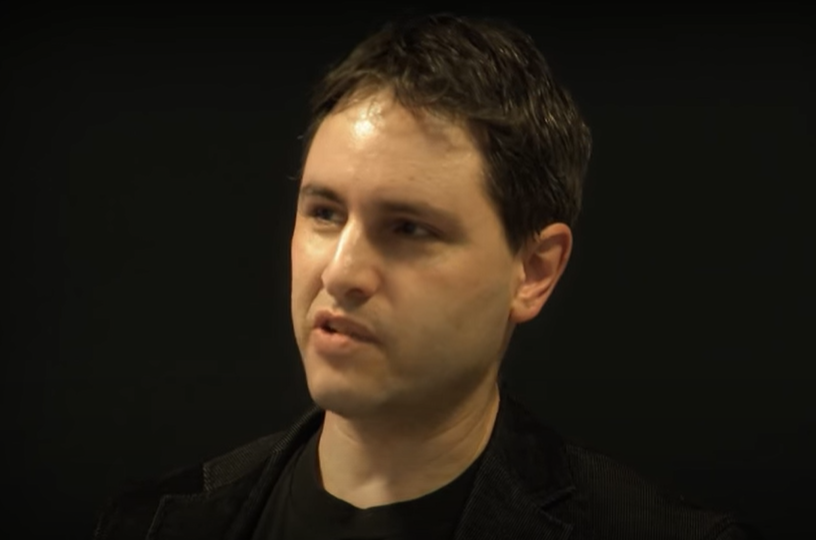
- Born: 2 February 1967 (age 59); Toronto, Ontario
- Education: BA (philosophy, 1991); MA (philosophy, 1994); PhD (philosophy, 2000); BEd (English and Social Studies, 2006)
- Alma mater: University of Toronto
- Occupations: Philosopher, writer
- Known for: Animal ethics
- Website: davidsztybel.info

David Sztybel (born 2 February 1967) is a Canadian philosopher specializing in animal ethics.

== Education and career ==
Sztybel was born in Toronto, Ontario. He obtained his BA in philosophy in 1991, his MA in 1994, and his PhD in 2000 – for a thesis entitled "Empathy and Rationality in Ethics" – from the University of Toronto.

He fulfilled an Advisory Research Committee Post-Doctoral Fellowship at Queen's University (2001-2002), held a fellowship at the Oxford Centre for Animal Ethics (2007–2011), and a research fellowship at the University of Vienna (2011 to present). Most of his work is related to animal rights.

Sztybel has been a vegan since 1988.

== Research ==
Sztybel has developed a new theory of animal rights which he terms "best caring", as outlined in his paper "The Rights of Animal Persons". Criticizing conventional theories of rights based on intuition, traditionalism or common sense, compassion, Immanuel Kant's theory, John Rawls's theory, and Alan Gewirth's theory, Sztybel devises a new theory of rights for human and nonhuman animals. Sztybel bases his theory, in part, on the idea that sentient beings are ends-in-themselves, a theory of emotional cognition which verifies that some things really are good or bad for sentient beings. This is a non-utilitarian or "individuals-respecting" theory that defends the proposition that all sentient beings should be legally recognized as persons.

He is critical of utilitarianism and the traditional feminist ethics of care. He also takes issue with the traditional notion of animal welfare, which supports the use of animals if steps are taken to avoid "unnecessary" suffering, the parameters of which vary. Sztybel argues that we would never call the same treatment of humans, mentally disabled or otherwise, to be consistent with their welfare. He coined the term "animal illfare" to describe conventional animal treatment. He holds that true animal welfare would only entail wishing animals good (never anything avoidably malicious). He supports that fully realized substantial animal rights correspond to a significant respect for all sentient beings.

Sztybel contends that Singer's philosophy of animal liberation is not really about liberating animals in general; he accuses Singer of being a speciesist for defending the vivisection of animals on the ground that they have inferior cognitive capacities. In so doing, Singer is effectively sanctioning the harmful treatment of nonhuman animals on the basis of a species-characteristic which does not justify violent treatment.

He also provides a critique of the abolitionist views of Gary L. Francione and Joan Dunayer, who argue that animal rights supporters should not pursue a welfarist approach. A defense of suffering-reduction laws and a discussion of the logical problems of anti-welfarism are featured in Sztybel's article "Animal Rights Law: Fundamentalism versus Pragmatism".

== See also ==
- List of animal rights advocates

== Selected publications ==
- "Animal Rights Law: Fundamentalism versus Pragmatism." Journal for Critical Animal Studies 5 (1) (2007): 1-37. https://web.archive.org/web/20090205001448/http://www.criticalanimalstudies.org/JCAS/Journal_Articles_download/Issue_6/sztybel.pdf
- "The Rights of Animal Persons." Animal Liberation Philosophy and Policy Journal 4 (1) (Spring 2006): 1-37. https://web.archive.org/web/20090106123436/http://www.criticalanimalstudies.org/JCAS/Journal_Articles_download/Issue_5/sztybel.pdf
- "Can the Treatment of Animals Be Compared to the Holocaust?" Ethics and the Environment 11 (Spring 2006): 97-132.
- "A Living Will Clause for Supporters of Animal Experimentation." Journal of Applied Philosophy 23 (May 2006): 174-189.
- "Animal Rights: Autonomy and Redundancy." Journal of Agricultural and Environmental Ethics 14 (3) (2001): 259-73.
- "Taking Humanism Seriously: 'Obligatory' Anthropocentrism." Journal of Agricultural and Environmental Ethics 13 (3/4) (2000): 181-203.
- "Marxism and Animal Rights." Ethics and the Environment 2 (Fall 1997): 169-85.
- Three articles for The Encyclopedia of Animal Rights and Animal Welfare, pp. 130–32. Edited by Marc Bekoff. Westport, Connecticut: Greenwood Publishing Group, 1998: "René Descartes", "Distinguishing Animal Rights from Animal Welfare", and "Jainism".
- "How I Became Vegan" in Michael Lanfield The Interconnectedness of Life: We Are Interconnected. pp. 96. We Are Interconnected Films, 2015.
