= Brigitte Gothière =

French activist (born 1973)

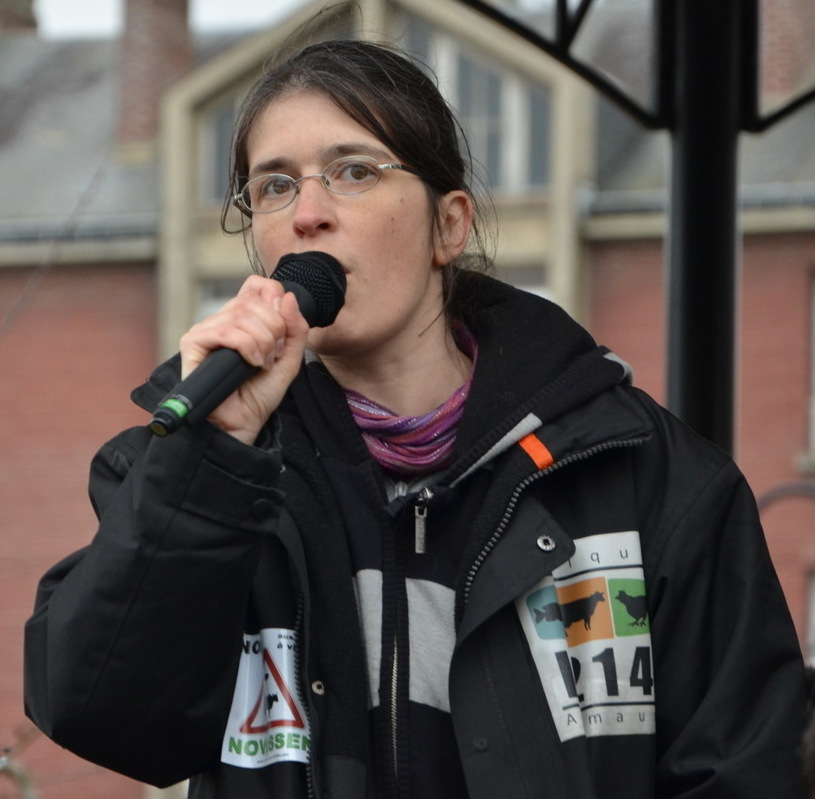
- Gothière in 2012
- Born: 18 May 1973 (age 53); France
- Occupation: Activist
- Years active: 1998–present
- Known for: Animal rights and veganism activism; co-founding L214
- Spouse: Sébastien Arsac (m. 1996)
- Children: 2

Brigitte Gothière (born 18 May 1973) is a French animal rights and veganism activist. She is the president and co-founder of the animal rights organisation L214. From 1998 to 2019, she was also an editor of the antispeciesist journal Cahiers antispécistes.

== Biography ==
=== Early and personal life ===
Gothière was born on 18 May 1973. Her mother was a nurse and her father was an electrical engineer.

At the age of 18, Gothière began volunteering with the Red Cross. According to France Inter, her parents' involvement in community associations influenced her early activism, which included support for undocumented migrants and opposition to sexism and racism.

Gothière studied mathematics and electronics at university. In 1993, during her studies, she became vegan, avoiding meat and other animal products. After completing her studies, she taught at a vocational high school and later taught applied physics in Lyon.

She married fellow activist Sébastien Arsac in 1996; they had met in high school. They have two children, who are also vegan.

=== Activism ===
In 1998, Gothière and Arsac joined the editorial team of the journal Cahiers antispécistes, which focused on antispeciesism. She remained an editor until the journal ceased publication in 2019.

In 2003, Gothière was a member of the Stop Gavage campaign, which opposed the force-feeding of ducks and geese. In 2008, she and Arsac founded L214, an animal rights organisation that publishes undercover footage from animal agriculture. Gothière serves as its president. In a 2018 interview with The New York Times, she said that "only a vegan society would amount to success", while describing incremental change as progress.

== See also ==
- List of animal rights advocates
