= Animal welfare and rights in France =

Treatment of and laws concerning non-human animals in France

Animal welfare and rights in France is about the treatment of and laws concerning non-human animals in France. France has moderate animal welfare protections by international standards.

== Legislation ==
France passed its first animal protection law in 1850, though this law prohibited only public cruelty towards animals. In 1959, France issued a decree incriminating the mistreatment of domestic or captive animals. In 1976, France passed an animal welfare law which recognizes the sentience of domestic animals (making it one of the first countries to recognize animal sentience) and requires that alternatives to animal testing be used where it is deemed possible.

France's main regulations on animal cruelty fall under the Penal Code and the Rural and Maritime Fishing Code, which protect domesticated, tamed, and captive animals. The Penal Code makes it an offense to seriously physically abuse or sexually abuse, commit and act of cruelty towards, or abandon a domesticated, tamed, or captive animal. Bullfighting and cockfighting are exempt from this provision where an "uninterrupted local tradition" can be invoked. The Rural and Maritime Fishing Code gives more detail on what constitutes cruelty. Force-feeding geese and ducks to produce foie gras is exempted from anti-cruelty legislation, and law requires that product labelled as foie gras must come from force-fed animals. And, as these statutes apply only to domestic, tamed, and captive animals, there are no basic criminal sanctions for cruelty towards wild animals.

France's farmed animal protections comply with the minimum standards set by the European Union (EU). As for animals used in research, the Rural and Maritime Fishing Code sets out licensing and welfare requirements, founded on The Three Rs: reduce the number of animals used, refine methods to cause less suffering, and replace animals where it is deemed scientifically appropriate. In 2005, the French government resisted the EU's ban on testing cosmetics on animals, taking its case to the European Court of Justice, where it was defeated.

In 2014 and again in 2020, France received a C out of possible grades A, B, C, D, E, F, G on World Animal Protection's Animal Protection Index. In 2015, the French parliament amended the French Civil Code to change the classification of non-human animals from "moveable property" to "living beings gifted sentience". However, the law does not specify what protections, if any, animals have as "living beings gifted with sentience", so it is unclear whether this will lead to changes in animal welfare policy.

== Animal issues ==
=== Animals used for food ===
==== Animal agriculture ====
Animals raised and killed for food in France each year include:

- 13.3 million pigs (herd size) (2014)
- 19.25 million bovine animals (herd size) (2014), the highest in the EU
- 7.17 million sheep (herd size) (2014)
- 0.94 million goats (herd size) (2014)
- 745 million chickens (total killed) (2014)
- 76 million ducks (total killed) (2014)
- 46 million turkeys (total killed) (2014)
- 51.3 million egg-laying hens (herd size) (2010)
- 205,000 tons of aquaculture animals (2012)
- 529,000 tons of wild-caught marine animals (2013)

France is the EU's largest egg producer. In late 2011, French animal activists obtained images from several farms of egg-laying hens on in barren battery cages, despite the fact that EU rules require larger "enriched" cages. On one farm, five birds on average were in cages designed for three. The group monitored the birds over time, finding that many lost their feathers and had their beaks trimmed, and that dead hens were left in cages.

France is a major producer of the highly controversial delicacy foie gras, which involves enlarging the livers of geese and ducks by force-feeding them for several weeks. Several European countries, including Britain, Norway, Sweden, Germany, and Switzerland, and well as the American state of California have banned foie gras production. In a 2014 survey by a French animal protection group, 47% of respondents said they would support a ban on force-feeding.

In 2016, French animal activist group L214 released undercover video of an "organic" French slaughterhouse in which animals are seen to be tortured by slaughterhouse staff and slaughtered while still conscious. The video prompted authorities to close the slaughterhouse for two months.

==== Veganism ====
Figures on the number of vegans in France are not readily available, though surveys have estimated that roughly 1.5-2% of French identify as vegetarian. A 2011 decree by the French government effectively outlawed the serving of vegan meals at French schools, and similar decrees have been proposed for kindergartens, hospitals, prisons, and retirement homes.

=== Animals used for research ===
According to the EU's latest statistical report on animal testing, French researchers performed tests on roughly 2.2 million animals in 2011, the most of any EU country.

=== Animals used for clothing ===
Fur farming is legal in France. There are dozens of fur farms in France, where mink, rabbits, and other animals are raised. In 2013 a proposal to ban new farms was formulated by a member of parliament, but no such proposal has been passed as of 2016.

== Animal activism ==
L214 is a French animal activist group founded in 2008 which focuses on animals used for food, given the fact that they account for the vast majority of animals used by humans. Their activities involve informational outreach about the conditions of animals on farms, undercover investigations of animal use operations, promoting veganism, and "rais[ing] the question of speciesism". The organization's namesake is the article of the 1976 French rural code which first recognized animals as sentient beings.

One Voice is another major animal protection group active in France, founded in 1998. Their activities include campaigns against animal experimentation, fur farming, bullfighting, animal abuse in circuses, and for the welfare of farm animals and whales and dolphins.

== See also ==
- Animal consciousness
- Speciesism
- Timeline of animal welfare and rights
- Timeline of animal welfare and rights in Europe
