= Carl Cohen (philosopher) =

American philosopher (1931–2023)

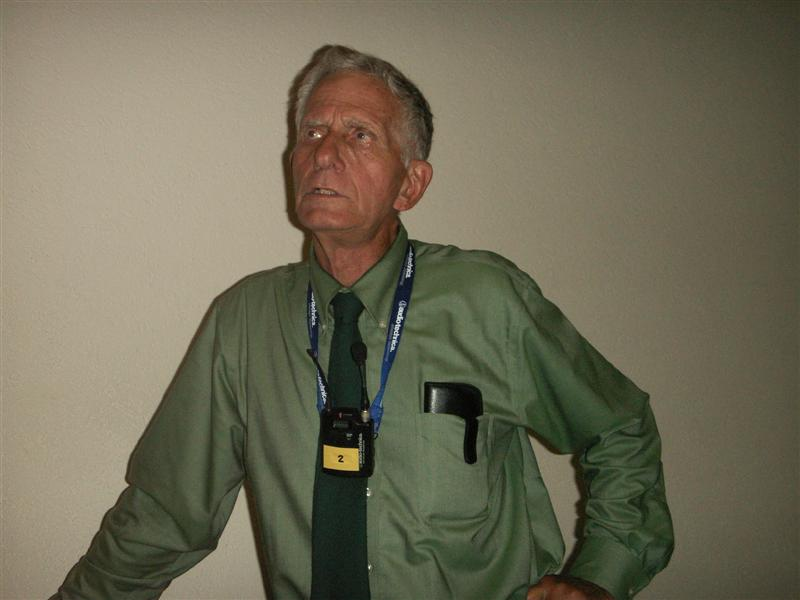
- Cohen in 2006
- Born: April 30, 1931
- Died: August 26, 2023 (aged 92)

Philosophical work
- Era: 21st-century philosophy
- Region: Western philosophy
- School: Analytic philosophy
- Main interests: Ethics, political philosophy
- Notable ideas: Arguments for animal experimentation, arguments against affirmative action

Carl Cohen (April 30, 1931 – August 26, 2023) was an American philosopher, academic, and civil liberties advocate. He was Professor of Philosophy at the Residential College of the University of Michigan, in Ann Arbor, Michigan, U.S.

Cohen was co-author of The Animal Rights Debate (Rowman and Littlefield, 2001), a point-counterpoint volume with Tom Regan; he is also the author of Democracy (Macmillan, 1972); the author of Four Systems (Random House, 1982); the editor of Communism, Fascism, and Democracy (McGraw Hill, 1997); the co-author (with J. Sterba) of Affirmative Action and Racial Preference (Oxford, 2003), co-author (with I. M. Copi) of Introduction to Logic, 13th edition (Prentice-Hall, 2008), and author of A Conflict of Principles: The Battle over Affirmative Action at the University of Michigan (University Press of Kansas, 2014).

Cohen published many essays in moral and political philosophy in philosophical, medical, and legal journals. He served as a member of the Medical School faculty of the University of Michigan, and as Chairman of the University of Michigan faculty, where he was an active member of the philosophy faculty from 1955. In 2006 the University held a celebration honoring his 50 years on the faculty.

== Historical influence and political influence ==
=== University of Michigan Residential College ===
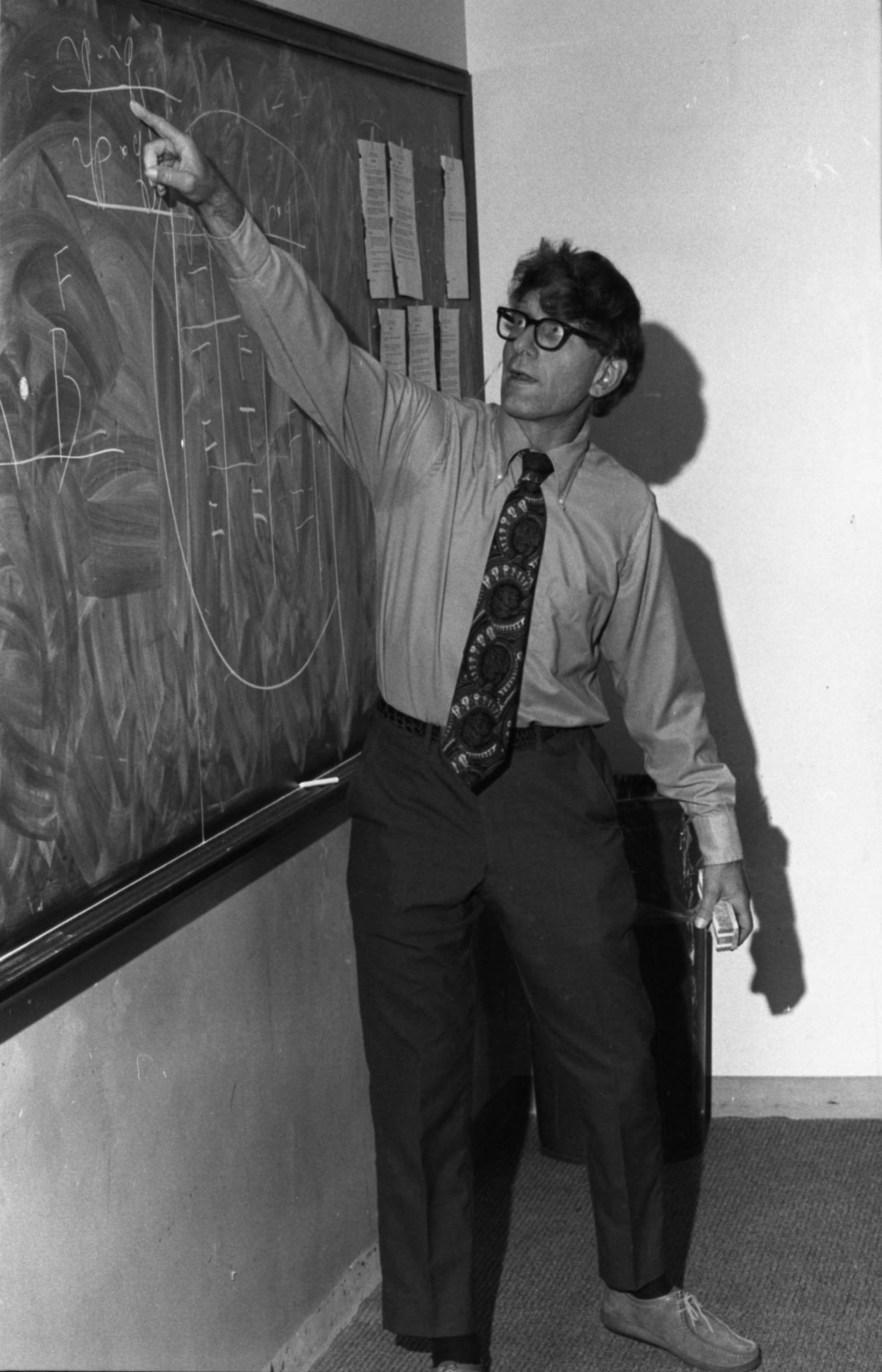
Cohen lecturing in 1977 at the University of Michigan

From 1964 to 1967, Cohen, then an Associate Prof. of Philosophy, was an active member of the small planning committee for the Residential College of the University of Michigan. He became the principal author of the "Blue Book" which laid the intellectual foundations for the Residential College. When the Residential College opened in 1967 Cohen became a full-time member of its faculty, and his appointment was shifted from the Department of Philosophy to the Residential College, where he remains the only one of that founding group serving as an active member of the Michigan faculty.

In 1998 anonymous donations totaling some $13,000 were made to the university to name a reading room in the Residential College in Cohen's honor. This was done; a plaque honoring him was placed. It was removed shortly afterwards, however, the reason given being "procedural violations." Many in the University believed that Cohen was being discriminated against because of his outspoken and unpopular opposition to the race-conscious admissions system of the University. Senior members of the Law School faculty, and other faculties, who did not agree with Cohen's views on the admissions matter, nevertheless wrote angrily to the President, Lee Bollinger, in the conviction that technical violations of procedure were being arbitrarily invoked against him, and that the reputation of the University had been besmirched. The President agreed to replace the plaque and to reaffirm the name of the Reading Room; Cohen agreed that his own donation of $10,000 to the University for the room be made public.

=== Racial preference issues ===
In 1996, Cohen made public information he had gathered using the State of Michigan's Freedom of Information Act (FOIA) about the substantial weight of racial factors in the University of Michigan undergraduate admissions office use of a "grid system". Jennifer Gratz and Patrick Hamacher sued the University based on this data. Barbara Grutter, in a separate proceeding, sued the Law School of the University of Michigan relying on additional data also revealed by Cohen's FOIA inquiry. While the U-M changed its "grid system" to a "point system" the following year, it argued that both mechanical systems were identical in outcome and that the point system, which became more famous, was designed merely to be easier to understand. The system that Cohen made public was ruled unconstitutional by the U. S. Supreme Court in Gratz v. Bollinger, as a "mechanical system," although in a separate ruling, Grutter v. Bollinger, concerning the U-M Law School, the limited use of non-mechanical preferences was allowed.

Following the U.S. Supreme Court's rulings on June 23, 2003, Cohen, Gratz, Grutter, and others were among those who invited Ward Connerly to Michigan, where he appeared in a July 8, 2003, speech on the Michigan campus announcing the formation of the Michigan Civil Rights Initiative (MCRI), to forbid preference by race or nationality in the state. This became Proposition 2 (06-2) in Michigan, appearing on the November 8, 2006, ballot. Cohen was a leading spokesperson for Proposition 2 in a heated electoral campaign. Proposition 2 passed by a 58%–42% margin. As a result of Cohen's involvement in the issue, he has appeared on numerous panels and in media reports on racial preferences since the mid-1990s.

=== Civil liberties activism ===
Cohen was a lifetime activist for the American Civil Liberties Union (ACLU), serving as Chair of the Michigan affiliate of the ACLU, and for years as a member of the National Board of Directors of the ACLU.

When the American Nazi Party threatened, in 1978, to march in Skokie, Illinois, Cohen published (in The Nation to which he was a regular contributor) several widely reprinted essays defending the right to present publicly even the most abhorrent political views. When (as a part of the protest against the Vietnam War) efforts were made to forbid research of certain kinds on the U-M campus, Cohen strongly supported the freedom of faculty members to engage in the inquiries that they thought appropriate. During that war Cohen, in active protest, defended selective conscientious objection, and defended some, but not all, civil disobedience. When University administrators sought to censor the showing of sexually explicit films on campus, Cohen, then serving as Chair of the University faculty, strongly defended student freedoms before the Regents of the University, with ultimate success. In the mid-1970s, when the fear of misuse led some to oppose the continuation of research in recombinant DNA technology, Cohen defended such research vigorously, both on the Michigan campus and also in The New England Journal of Medicine.

Cohen maintained his membership in the ACLU despite his disagreement with the organization's support of race preferences in university admissions.

=== Research ethics ===
From 1985 to 1995 a fraction of Cohen's appointment was in the Medical School of the University of Michigan, where he served as Professor of Philosophy and as Director of the Program in Human Values in Medicine. There he served also as a founding member of the Michigan Medical Center's Ethics Committee, as a member of its Institutional Animal Care and Use Committee, and for more than 30 years, as a member of its Institutional Review Board (IRB). Cohen's involvement with research on humans led to reflections on the uses of animals in science, which he defends; and on the limited uses of prisoners as research subjects, which he also defends; on ethical issues in transplant medicine; and on abortion.

=== Labor arbitration activities ===
Having written much about the concept of justice, Cohen became involved, during the 1970s, in the process of Labor/Management arbitration. With the support of the late economist William Haber, a well-known labor arbitrator, Cohen became a member of the Labor Panel of the American Arbitration Association, and over the years issued many arbitration awards in many industries. Cohen remained an active arbitrator for the AAA, and also an Act 312 Arbitrator, and Grievance Arbitrator, for the State of Michigan.

== Death ==
Cohen died on August 26, 2023, at the age of 92. He was buried at Forest Hill Cemetery in Ann Arbor, Michigan.

His archival material is in two libraries. Most is at the Bentley Historical Library at the University of Michigan.

At The Walter P. Reuther Library, Wayne State University, Detroit, Michigan, repose Carl Cohen's files documenting his work with the American Civil Liberties Union.

== Bibliography ==
- A Conflict of Principles: The Battle over Affirmative Action at the University of Michigan. Lawrence KS, University Press of Kansas, 2014. ISBN 978-0700619962
- Haben Tiere Rechte?. Interdisziplinäre Arbeitsgemeinschaft Tierethik (Hrsg.). Tierrechte - Eine interdisziplinäre Herausforderung. Erlangen 2007. ISBN 978-3-89131-417-3
- On Rule by the People. Beijing: The Commercial Press, 2004.
- Affirmative Action and Racial Preference. New York and London: Oxford University Press, 2003.
- The Animal Rights Debate. New York, London, Rowman & Littlefield, 2001.
- Introduction to Logic. New York, London, Prentice-Hall, 2001, 2004.
- Naked Racial Preference:The Case Against Affirmative Action. New York, London, Madison Books, Rowman and Littlefield, 1995.
- Four Systems. New York, Random House, 1982.
- Democracy. Athens GA: University of Georgia Press, 1971. New York: The Free Press, Macmillan, 1973.
- Civil Disobedience: Conscience, Tactics, and the Law. New York: Columbia University Press, 1971.
- Communism, Fascism and Democracy: The Theoretical Foundations. New York: Random House, 1962.

== See also ==
- American philosophy
- List of American philosophers
