= Thomas Lepeltier =

French scholar, essayist, and writer (born 1967)

- Born: 4 January 1967 (age 59)
- Occupations: Scholar; essayist; writer
- Website: thomaslepeltier.fr

Thomas Lepeltier (born 4 January 1967) is a French scholar, essayist and writer whose work has covered the history and philosophy of science, applied ethics, animal ethics and animal law. His books include L'imposture intellectuelle des carnivores ("The Intellectual Deception of Carnivores"), Darwin hérétique ("Darwin Heretic") and Univers parallèles ("Parallel Universes"). He was first known for work in the history of science, and later became associated with French-language advocacy on animal ethics and veganism.

== Life and work ==
Thomas Lepeltier was born on 4 January 1967. After completing a PhD in astrophysics in 1994, Lepeltier taught in Newcastle, Toulouse and Paris. He then worked on the history and philosophy of science. He later developed an interest in animal ethics and veganism after reading Charles Patterson's Eternal Treblinka. Lepeltier published La Révolution végétarienne ("The Vegetarian Revolution") in 2013. The book discusses the history of slavery abolition and argues that the "struggle for veganism will eventually succeed as the struggle against human slavery did". He became an Associate Fellow of the Oxford Centre for Animal Ethics in 2019.

Lepeltier has appeared in debates on animal ethics on French television, radio and public forums. In his writing on animal ethics, he has criticised arguments used to justify the use of animals. He has referred to Peter Singer's definition of speciesism, argued that theories of the social contract do not require beings to be capable of duties in order to have rights, and described killing animals for food as cruel when done for human pleasure.

Lepeltier has contributed to the French popular science magazines La Recherche and Sciences Humaines. He is also an editor of and writer for the French-language antispeciesist journal L'Amorce ("The Primer").

== Philosophy ==
Lepeltier is an antispeciesist. He argues that species membership is not, by itself, a relevant criterion for moral consideration, and that belonging to a particular species cannot justify killing an animal for food.

Lepeltier has criticised arguments made by French-speaking intellectuals in defence of meat, eggs and dairy products. In a 2018 article, he wrote that "most say or even write anything to justify their consumption of meat, eggs and dairy products" and criticised what he called the "bad faith" of professionals, the silence of politicians and the "ineptitude" of intellectuals. He has been criticised for his rejection of all animal breeding, including non-industrial breeding, and for using analogies with human slavery and the Holocaust.

Within the French animalist movement, Lepeltier has argued for intervention to reduce the suffering of wild animals. He has written that the fact that humans are not responsible for the condition of wild animals should not make them indifferent to wild animal suffering, and that humans should consider ways to reduce it. He has also discussed the predation problem, arguing that humans should work towards preventing predation.

== Publications ==
=== As author ===
- Les véganes vont-ils prendre le pouvoir?, Éditions du Pommier, 2019.
- L'imposture intellectuelle des carnivores, Max Milo, 2017.
- La Face cachée de l'Univers. Une autre histoire de la cosmologie, Seuil, 2014.
- La Révolution végétarienne, Éditions Sciences Humaines, 2013.
- Univers parallèles, Seuil, 2010.
- Vive le créationnisme! Point de vue d'un évolutionniste, L'Aube, 2009.
- Darwin hérétique: L'éternel retour du créationnisme, Seuil, 2007.

=== As co-author ===
- Les Grands penseurs de l'éducation, Éditions Sciences Humaines, 2018.
- La Philosophie, un art de vivre, Éditions Sciences Humaines, 2017.
- Les grands mythes, Éditions Sciences Humaines, 2017.
- Les religions: Des origines au IIIe millénaire, Éditions Sciences Humaines, 2017.
- Peter Singer et La libération animale, Pur, 2017.
- Révolutions animales, Les Liens qui Libèrent, 2016.
- Masculin-Féminin-Pluriel, Éditions Sciences Humaines, 2014.
- Creationism in Europe, Johns Hopkins, 2014.
- Le sexe d'hier à aujourd'hui, Éditions Sciences Humaines, 2013.
- Philosophie: Auteurs et Thèmes, Éditions Sciences Humaines, 2012.
- Cinq siècles de pensée française, Éditions Sciences Humaines, 2010.
- La bibliothèque idéale des sciences humaines, Éditions Sciences Humaines, 2008.
- Le tout et les parties dans les systèmes naturels, Vuibert, 2007.
- La Religion: Unité et diversité, Éditions Sciences Humaines, 2007.

=== As editor ===
- La Révolution antispéciste, Puf, 2018.
- Histoire et philosophie des sciences, Éditions Sciences Humaines, 2013.
- Un autre cosmos?, Vuibert, 2012.
