= Veggie Pride =

International vegetarianism event

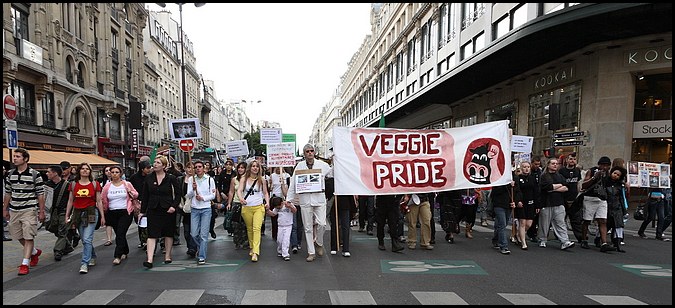
- 2008 Veggie Pride in Paris
- Frequency: Annually
- Country: International
- Years active: 25
- Founded: 2001
- Website: www.veggiepride.org

Veggie Pride is an international event that celebrates and promotes vegetarianism (including veganism).

== Background ==
Veggie Pride has been held annually in Paris since 2001 and has later been emulated in other cities in the world. It brings together vegetarians, including vegans, who want to show their pride to refuse to eat animals and denounce the discrimination which they claim they suffer, both personally and in terms of expressing their ideas. Veggie Pride aims to encourage vegetarians to affirm their convictions and to bring society to accept the debate on the legitimacy of the consumption of animals.

== International spread ==
The first Italian Veggie Pride was held in Rome on 17 May 2008 and was attended by about 700 people. In 2009, Veggie Pride was held on May 16 simultaneously in Birmingham, Lyon, Milan and Prague.

The first American Veggie Pride Parade was in 2008 in Manhattan, New York and was attended by several hundred people. The NYC parade continues to be held annually.

On April 26, 2009, the Los Angeles Veggie Pride Parade was celebrated, that had Rory Freedman, author of Skinny Bitch, and Karen Dawn, author of Thanking the Monkey: Rethinking the Way We Treat Animals as special guest speakers. On May 17 of the same year the New York Veggie Pride Parade was celebrated, which included Freya Dinshah, director of the American Vegan Society, the Queens city councilman and mayoral candidate Tony Avella, Paul Shapiro, director of factory farming campaigns of the Humane Society of the United States and Christine "Peanut" Vardaros, vegan athlete, among others.

On June 2, 2012, the first Chicago Veggie Pride Parade was held in the Grant Park, Chicago.

== Gallery ==
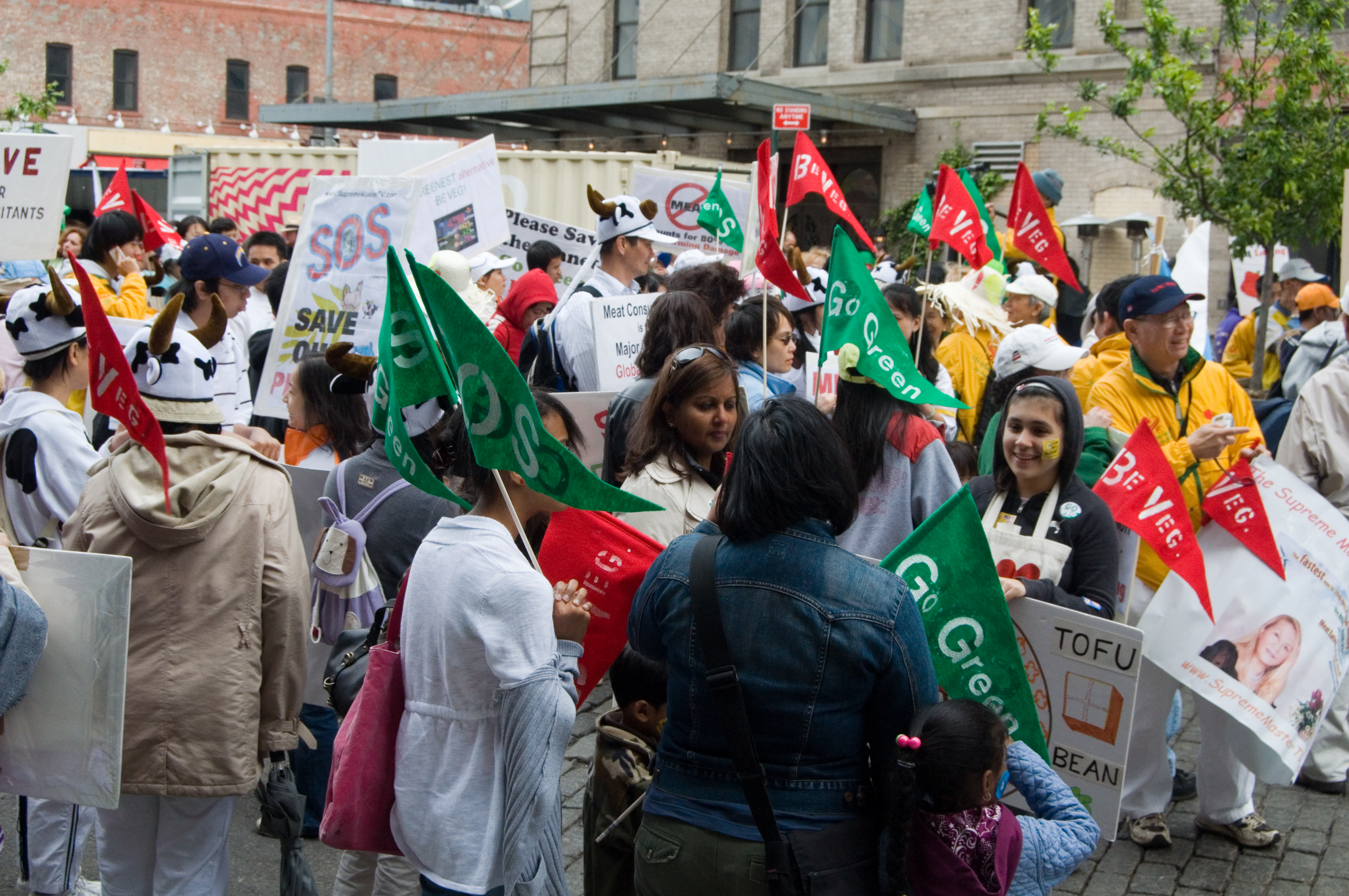
2009 Veggie Pride Parade in New York

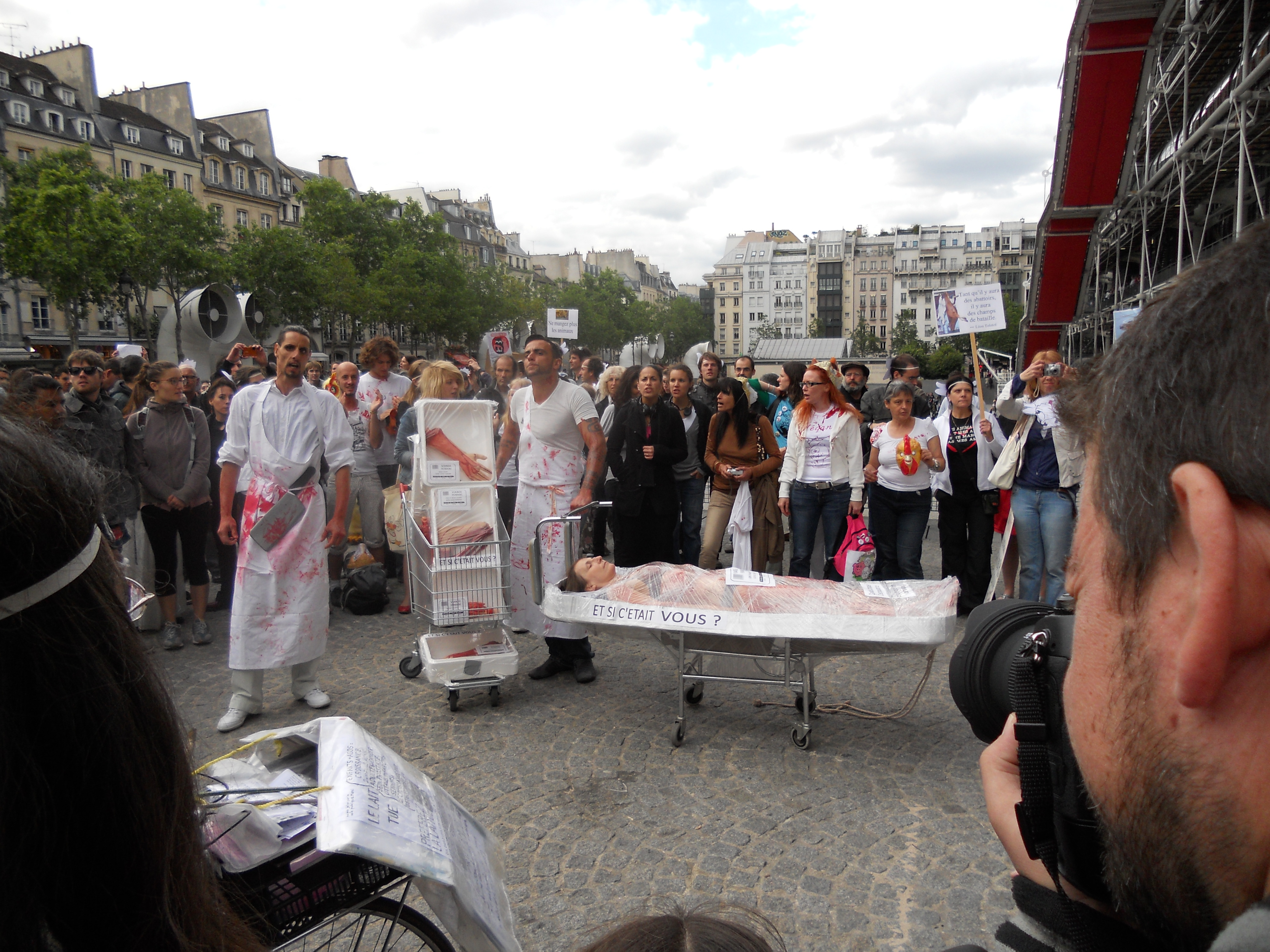
2011 Veggie Pride in Paris

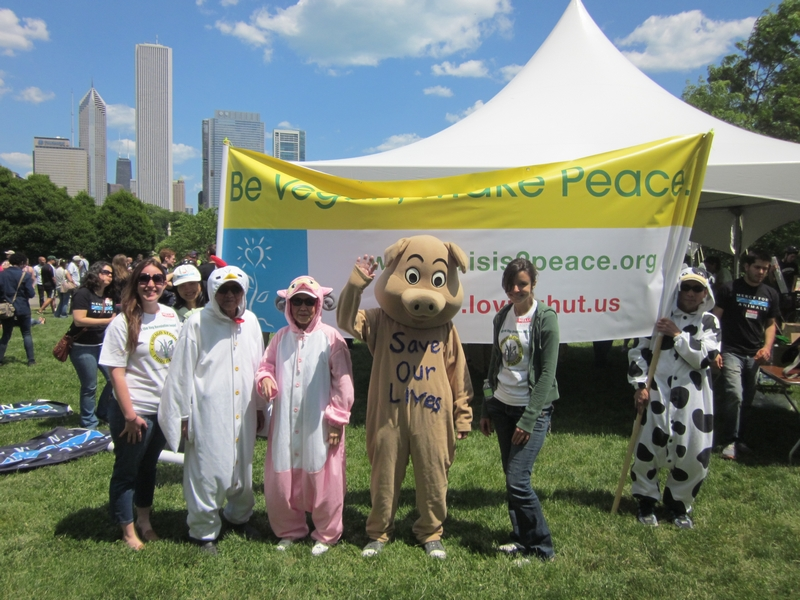
2012 Veggie Pride in Chicago
