= L214 =

French animal rights organization

- L214 éthique & animaux
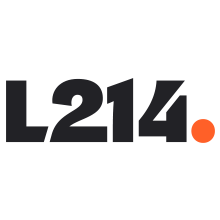
- Formation: 2008; 18 years ago
- Founders: Brigitte Gothière and Sébastien Arsac
- Type: Nonprofit
- Purpose: Promotion of animal rights and antispeciesism
- Region served: France
- President: Antoine Comiti
- Website: www.l214.com

L214 (also known as L214 éthique & animaux) is a French animal rights organization. It was founded in 2008 by the action group "Stop Gavage" (stop force-feeding) for the abolition of foie gras, which now continues its actions within L214. The organization is devoted to the welfare of animals used for human consumption (meat, milk, eggs, and fish), putting into question the links between society and animals.

== History ==
The name of the association comes from the article L214 of the French rural code in which animals are described as "sensitive beings" (êtres sensibles), which their owners are required to treat with respect. The co-founders Brigitte Gothière and Sébastien Arsac, are advocates for antispeciesism and have helped introduce these ideas in France through the journal Cahiers antispécistes.

== Focus ==
L214 wants to document and cover the ordinary conditions of livestock farming, fishing, animals' transportation and slaughter in order to "fuel public debate on animal welfare". It leads information campaigns to change animal protection rules as well as consumption patterns. Investigation pictures and experiences are frequently used in reports about agribusiness in media.

== Organizational structure ==
=== Funding ===
In 2016, L214 had a total budget of 760,000 euros, which allowed it to employ 17 people. In 2017, according to its co-founders, the association has financial resources totaling 5.2 million euros, including 3.2 million euros in membership fees from its 30,000 members (a number of members that has doubled compared to 2016).

In November 2017, the association received an exceptional donation of 1.14 million euros from the Open Philanthropy Project foundation. This organization, managed and funded by American billionaires Dustin Moskovitz and Cari Tuna, aims to financially support animal welfare (protection associations and research on cultured meat), justice and research on artificial intelligence. This donation follows a canvassing of the association by the foundation. Several projects were submitted: the improvement of standards in poultry breeding, the vegetalization of food on campuses and the perpetuation of L214 (creation of jobs and increase in salaries). In reaction, several deputies, from the French political party Les Républicains tried to set up a commission of inquiry to expose the financial networks of L214.

In November 2018, according to the association's treasurer, 90% of L214's funding comes from donations. The remaining 10% comes from the sale of derivative products (250,000 euros), the collection of royalties and interest from savings (several tens of thousands of euros). Among the 34,000 donations (which represent a total sum of 3,841,000 euros), 124 come from companies, foundations or associations.

The association received 5.9 million euros in donations in 2020, 700,000 euros in legacies, for an operating budget of less than 5 million, and almost 7 million euros in reserves.

=== Work conditions ===
The association has raised from 12 employees, including 3 permanent contracts, in 2015 to 74 employees, including 63 permanent contracts, in 2021, despite the departure of one employee out of five (15 people) between the beginning of 2020 and the beginning of 2021. The reasons given by former employees to justify these departures are of several kinds: "regular burn-outs, forced departures, heavy workloads, accusations of moral harassment, but also relative blindness to issues of sexist and sexual violence". The chain of repeated fixed-term contracts is also highlighted. In 2018, staff representatives requested that a protocol for the prevention of psychosocial risks at work be put in place. In 2019, only 13 of the 69 employees at the time considered conflict management within the association to be satisfactory. Equal pay was introduced in 2020: all employees received 2,025 euros net, with a 150 euros bonus if they lived in the Paris urban area.

In 2021, L214 was questioned by several activists about the lack of reaction to sexual violence within the association, or even trying to cover it up. Several cases of sexual harassment, sexual assault and rape were thus brought to the attention of the management, without the presumed authors (activists and former employees of L214) being worried at the time.

== Main awareness campaigns ==
=== Foie gras ===
In November 2013, an L214 investigation on force-feeding, in buildings of the Ernest Soulard company, which supply starred restaurants and Parisian luxury hotels, was published. In light of the controversy, the chef Joël Robuchon, target of the association, suspended his supply from Ernest Soulard, "until there is proof that animals are not abused as shown in the video". Alain Ducasse, who was also the target of the L214 campaign, still takes supplies from Ernest Soulard, despite an online petition against him.

In February 2013, after repeated presence in front of retail chain Monoprix stores by L214 activists in many big cities of France, the retailer decided to stop using eggs from hens grown in battery cages in their own brand from April 2013, using free-range eggs instead.

=== Novotel ===
In February 2010, after negotiating with L214 during the campaign led against Novotel, the hotel chain announced that eggs on their breakfast menu would henceforth come from free-range hens.

=== Charal ===
In September 2008, L214 investigated the Charal slaughterhouse in Metz (Moselle). This hidden camera investigation was led by an activist from the association hired by the firm Charal as a slaughterhouse worker. According to the association, two previous applications for visiting were refused, by an e-mail in which the Charal company declares having "made animal protection a central and specific part of their quality policy". The filmed investigation shows bovine slaughter which "do not respect the operative regulation and lead to untenable death" according to the association. The Minister of Agriculture, Bruno Le Maire was "shocked" by the pictures showing animals seeming to recover consciousness before and during being bled. L214 lodged a complaint against Charal Company in September 2009 about cruelty to animals. Charal wants L214 to remove the video from their websites, complains about violation of their site, and challenges charges by the association, denouncing "an assembly with false and partisan commentaries, whose only aim is to shock and make meat consumers feel guilty."

=== Bigard ===
For four months starting in February 2021, an L214 activist worked as a sanitary inspector with the Bigard French food processing industrial group with no qualifications for the position, following a January 2021 job offer. He had easily got a job interview during which he answered affirmatively when asked about his ability to withstand the sight of blood and had been taken on in mid-February. All his training took place on the job.

== Online sources ==
L214 makes their investigation videos and images available on their website under a Creative Commons license.

== See also ==
- List of animal rights groups
