= Speciesism =

Philosophical term on species treatment

Speciesism

The differential treatment of cattle and dogs is an example often discussed in relation to speciesism.

Speciesism (/ˈspiːʃiːˌzɪzəm, -siːˌzɪz-/) is a term used in philosophy and animal ethics for the treatment of individuals according to their species membership. The term has several definitions. Some writers define it as discrimination or unjustified treatment based on species membership, while others define it more broadly as prioritizing some species over others, regardless of whether that prioritization is justified. Richard D. Ryder, who coined the term, defined it as "a prejudice or attitude of bias in favour of the interests of members of one's own species and against those of members of other species".

The concept is used by philosophers, psychologists, sociologists and animal rights advocates to analyse differences in how humans treat non-human animals. Writers on the subject have applied it to practices including factory farming, animal slaughter, blood sports, the use of animals for fur and leather, animal testing, and the treatment of animals classified as feral or invasive. Some authors also connect speciesism with the refusal to assist animals suffering in the wild when their suffering results from natural processes.

The term first appeared in 1970 in a pamphlet by Ryder protesting against animal experimentation. It was later popularized by Peter Singer in Animal Liberation (1975). Other writers associated with the concept include Oscar Horta, Steven M. Wise, Gary L. Francione, Melanie Joy, David Nibert, Steven Best, and Ingrid Newkirk. The concept has also been criticized or rejected by writers including Carl Cohen, Nel Noddings, Bernard Williams, Peter Staudenmaier, Christopher Grau, Douglas Maclean, Roger Scruton, Thomas Wells, and Robert Nozick.

== History ==
=== Preceding ideas ===
==== Early perspectives on animal sensation and kinship ====
Buffon, a French naturalist, writing in Histoire Naturelle in 1753, questioned whether it could be doubted that animals "whose organization is similar to ours, must experience similar sensations", and that "those sensations must be proportioned to the activity and perfection of their senses". Despite this, he also maintained that there was a gap between humans and other animals.

In the poem "Poème sur le désastre de Lisbonne", Voltaire described a kinship between sentient beings, humans and animals alike, writing: "All sentient things, born by the same stern law, / Suffer like me, and like me also die."

==== Jeremy Bentham ====
Jeremy Bentham has been described as an early Western philosopher to argue for animals' equal consideration within a secular moral framework. He argued that species membership is morally irrelevant and that any being capable of suffering has intrinsic value. In his 1789 book An Introduction to the Principles of Morals and Legislation, he wrote:

The day may come, when the rest of the animal creation may acquire those rights which never could have been withheld from them but by the hand of tyranny. ... [T]he question is not, Can they reason? nor, Can they talk? but, Can they suffer?

Bentham also supported animal welfare laws. At the same time, he accepted the killing and use of animals, provided that what he regarded as unnecessary cruelty was avoided.

==== Lewis Gompertz ====
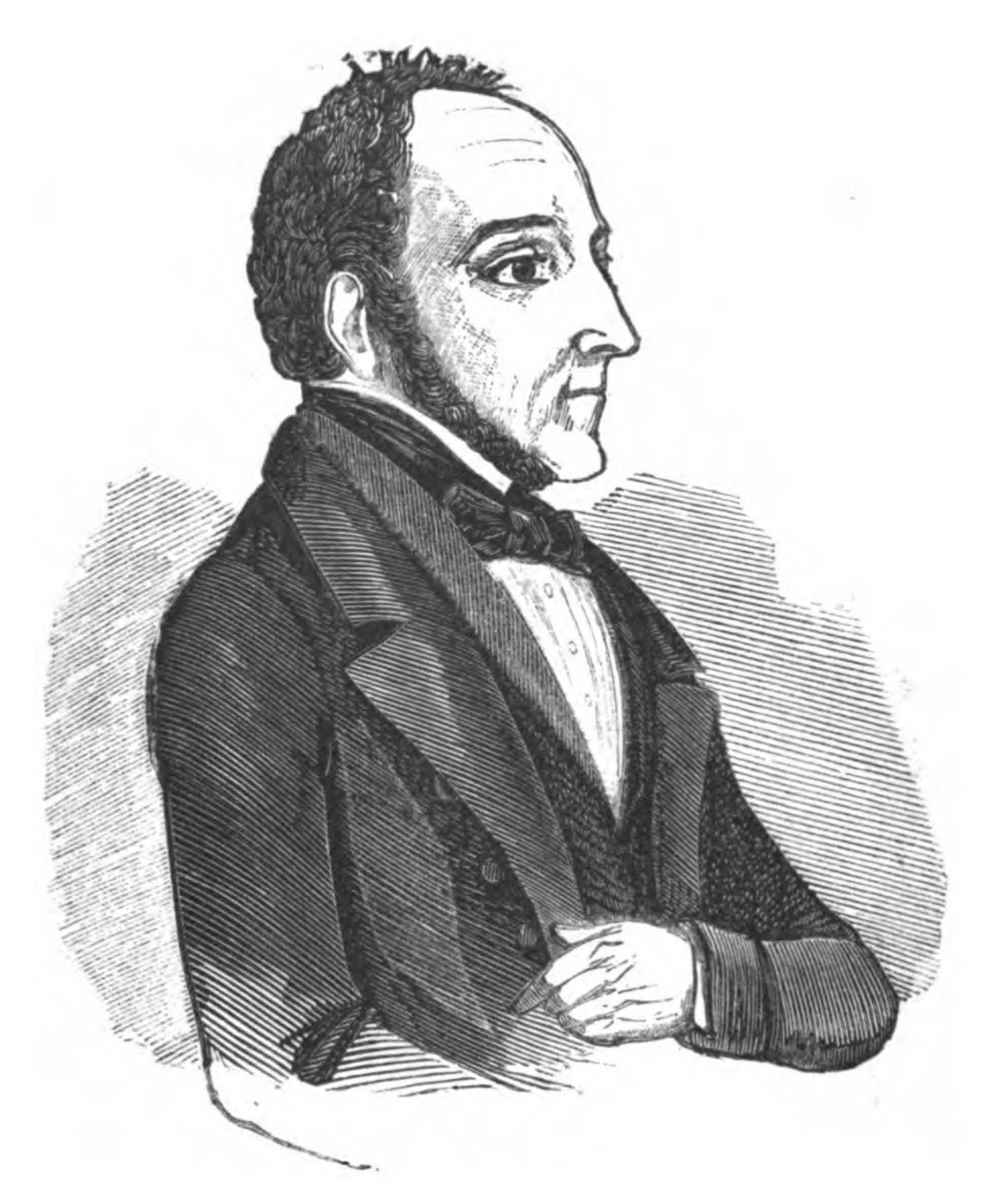
Lewis Gompertz stressed shared human and animal feelings, sensations, needs and physiological characteristics.

In his 1824 work Moral Inquiries on the Situation of Man and of Brutes, English writer and early animal rights advocate Lewis Gompertz argued for egalitarianism and extended it to nonhuman animals. He stated that humans and animals have similar feelings and sensations, and that experiences such as hunger, desire, fear and anger affect both in similar ways. Gompertz also pointed to shared physiological characteristics between humans and animals, which he took to suggest similar capacities for sensation. He criticized human use of animals, drawing attention to what he saw as disregard for their feelings, needs and desires.

==== Charles Darwin ====
English naturalist Charles Darwin, writing in his notebook in 1838, observed that humans tend to regard themselves as masterpieces produced by a deity, but recorded his own view that it was "truer to consider him created from animals". In his 1871 book The Descent of Man, Darwin argued:

There is no fundamental difference between man and the higher mammals in their mental faculties ... [t]he difference in mind between man and the higher animals, great as it is, certainly is one of degree and not of kind. We have seen that the senses and intuitions, the various emotions and faculties, such as love, memory, attention, curiosity, imitation, reason, etc., of which man boasts, may be found in an incipient, or even sometimes in a well-developed condition, in the lower animals.

==== Lewis H. Morgan ====
In 1843 Lewis H. Morgan published "Mind or Instinct: An Inquiry Concerning the Manifestation of Mind by the Lower Orders of Animals" in The Knickerbocker. Using anecdotes such as dogs returning to surgeons, beavers building dams, ants storing grain and marmots posting lookouts, Morgan argued that animals display memory, foresight and reasoning. He rejected appeals to "instinct" as an explanation, suggesting that humans and other species share a common mental principle differing only in degree. He also questioned claims of human moral superiority and criticized practices such as hunting for sport and killing animals for food. He developed these arguments in 1857 in an unpublished paper, "Animal Psychology", read to the Pundit Club in Rochester, New York. The paper again rejected instinct and attributed animal behaviour to perception, memory, reflection, volition and reason. Morgan also speculated that animals might possess moral capacities and immortal souls, and he placed species on a "scale of gradation" of intelligence while remaining a creationist. Although little noticed at the time, the essay has been described in later scholarship as an unusually early critique of instinct within American comparative psychology.

==== Arthur Schopenhauer ====
German philosopher Arthur Schopenhauer criticized anthropocentrism as, in his view, a fundamental defect of Christianity and Judaism. He argued that these religions contributed to the suffering of sentient beings by separating humans from other animals and encouraging their treatment as mere things. By contrast, Schopenhauer praised Brahmanism and Buddhism for their emphasis on kinship between humans and other animals and for their teaching about a connection between them through metempsychosis.

==== Secular and utilitarian animal advocacy ====
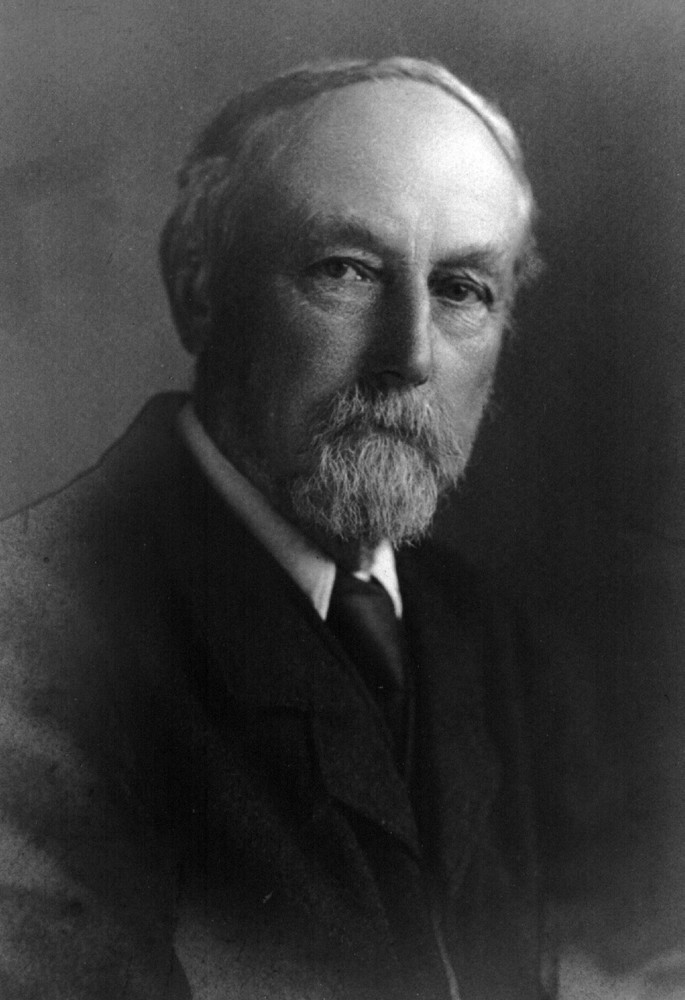
Henry S. Salt criticized the idea of a "great gulf" between humans and other animals.

According to historian Chien-hui Li, some secularist thinkers in the late 19th and early 20th centuries argued for animals on utilitarian grounds and on the basis of evolutionary kinship. They linked these views to a broader critique of Christian doctrines about suffering and social order, and sought a morality independent of religious authority. Some initially supported vivisection for human benefit but later questioned its necessity. Figures such as G. W. Foote argued for broader utility, focusing on long-term moral principles rather than immediate gains. Drawing on evolutionary theories, these writers described common origins and similarities between humans and animals and argued that morality should extend to animals as beings capable of experiencing pain and pleasure. They rejected the idea of a theological gulf separating humans from animals and used contemporary scientific theories to support various proposals for animal rights and welfare.

British writer and animal rights advocate Henry S. Salt, in his 1892 book Animals' Rights, argued that for humans to do justice to other animals they must look beyond the conception of a "great gulf" between them, claiming instead that people should recognize the "common bond of humanity that unites all living beings in one universal brotherhood".

Edward Payson Evans, an American scholar and animal rights advocate, criticized anthropocentric psychology and ethics in his 1897 work Evolutional Ethics and Animal Psychology. He argued that such views treat humans as fundamentally different from other sentient beings, and denied that this distinction removes all moral obligations toward animals. Evans held that Darwin's theory of evolution implies moral duties not only toward enslaved humans but also toward nonhuman animals. He asserted that beyond kind treatment, animals need enforceable rights to protect them from cruelty. Evans contended that recognizing kinship between humans and other sentient beings would make it impossible, in his view, to mistreat them.

An 1898 article in The Zoophilist, titled "Anthropocentric Ethics", argued that some early civilizations before Christianity regarded tenderness and mercy toward sentient beings as a moral requirement. It discussed Zarathustra, Buddha and early Greek philosophers who practiced vegetarianism as examples of this outlook. The article claimed that this understanding of human-animal kinship persisted into early Christianity but was challenged by figures such as Origen, who saw animals as mere automata for human use. It concluded that the relationship between animal psychology and evolutionary ethics was gaining scientific and moral attention.

In 1895, American zoologist, philosopher and animal rights advocate J. Howard Moore described vegetarianism as the ethical result of recognizing the evolutionary kinship of all creatures, connecting his position with Darwin's insights. He criticized what he called the "pre-Darwinian delusion" that nonhuman animals were created for human use. In his 1899 book Better-World Philosophy, Moore argued that human ethics were still anthropocentric, having developed to include various human groups but not animals. He proposed "zoocentricism" as a further development, extending ethical concern to the entire sentient universe. In his 1906 book The Universal Kinship, Moore criticized what he described as a "provincialist" attitude leading to animal mistreatment, comparing it to denying ethical relations among human groups. He rejected what he saw as a human-centred perspective and urged consideration of the standpoint of animal victims. Moore concluded that the Golden Rule should apply to all sentient beings, advocating equal ethical consideration for animals and humans:

[D]o as you would be done by, and not to the dark man and the white woman alone, but to the sorrel horse and the gray squirrel as well; not to creatures of your own anatomy only, but to all creatures.

=== Coining of the term ===
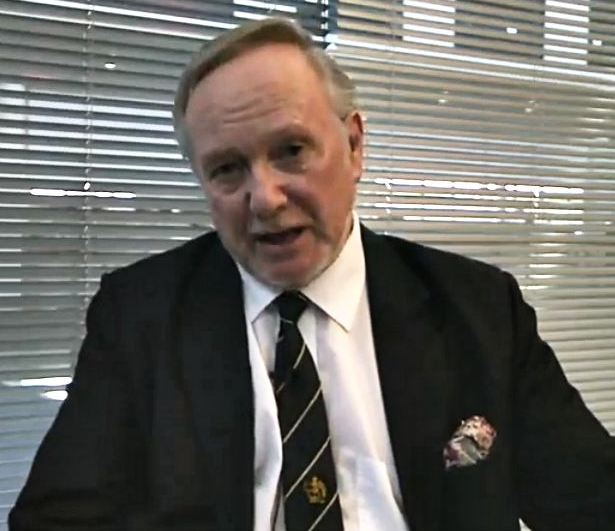
Richard D. Ryder coined the term "speciesism" in 1970.

The term speciesism, and the argument that it is a prejudice, first appeared in 1970 in a privately printed pamphlet written by British psychologist Richard D. Ryder. Ryder was a member of a group of academics in Oxford, England, the nascent animal rights community, now known as the Oxford Group. One of the group's activities was distributing pamphlets about areas of concern; the pamphlet titled "Speciesism" was written to protest against animal experimentation. Supporters of the term intended it to draw a categorical and rhetorical connection with racism and sexism.

Ryder stated in the pamphlet that "[s]ince Darwin, scientists have agreed that there is no 'magical' essential difference between humans and other animals, biologically-speaking. Why then do we make an almost total distinction morally? If all organisms are on one physical continuum, then we should also be on the same moral continuum." He wrote that, at that time in the United Kingdom, 5,000,000 animals were being used each year in experiments, and that attempting to gain benefits for one's own species through the mistreatment of others was "just 'speciesism' and as such it is a selfish emotional argument rather than a reasoned one".

Ryder used the term again in an essay, "Experiments on Animals", in Animals, Men and Morals (1971), a collection of essays on animal rights edited by philosophy graduate students Stanley and Roslind Godlovitch and John Harris, who were also members of the Oxford Group. Ryder wrote:

In as much as both "race" and "species" are vague terms used in the classification of living creatures according, largely, to physical appearance, an analogy can be made between them. Discrimination on grounds of race, although most universally condoned two centuries ago, is now widely condemned. Similarly, it may come to pass that enlightened minds may one day abhor "speciesism" as much as they now detest "racism". The illogicality in both forms of prejudice is of an identical sort. If it is accepted as morally wrong to deliberately inflict suffering upon innocent human creatures, then it is only logical to also regard it as wrong to inflict suffering on innocent individuals of other species. ... The time has come to act upon this logic.

=== Spread of the idea ===
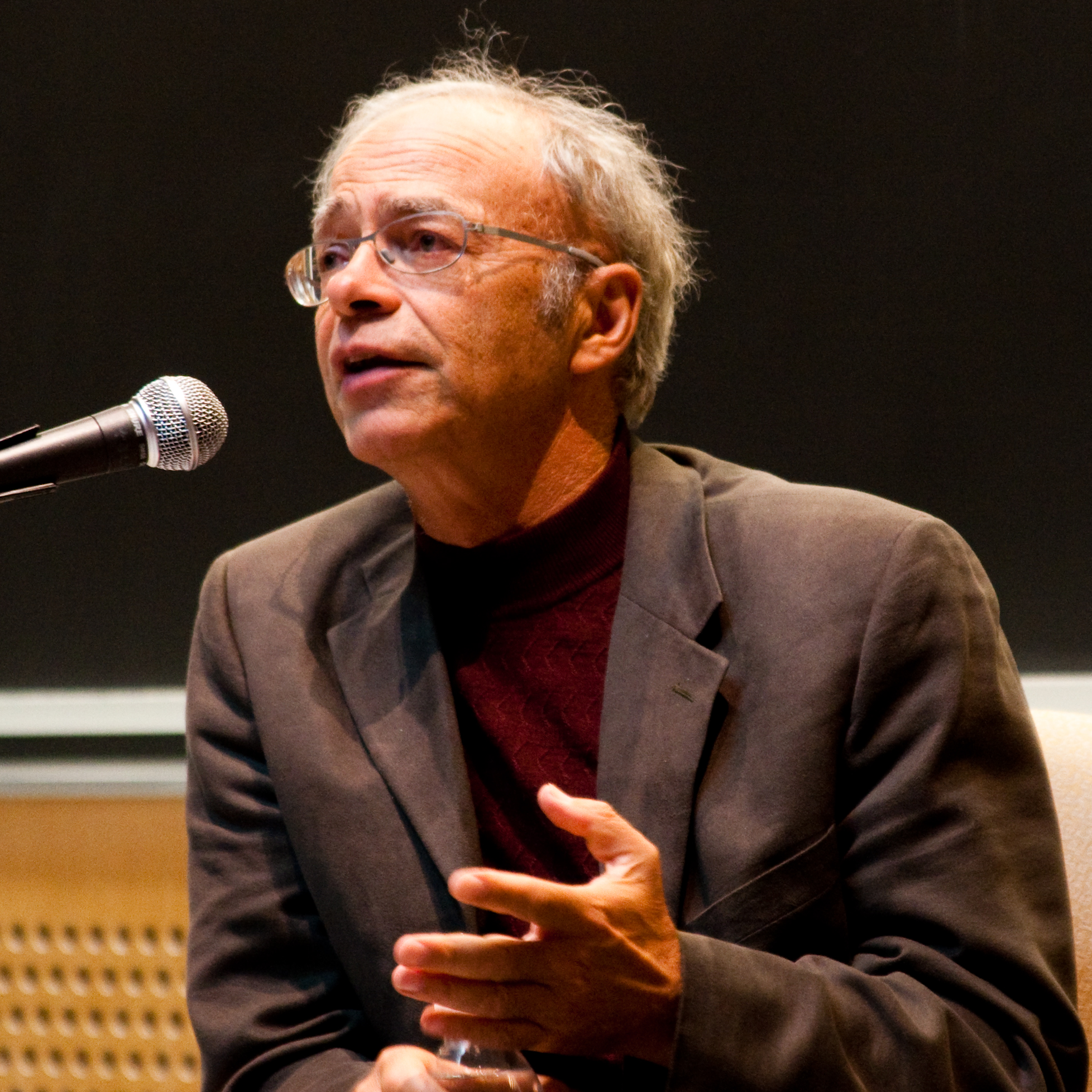
Peter Singer popularized the idea in Animal Liberation (1975).

The term was popularized by the Australian philosopher Peter Singer in his book Animal Liberation (1975). Singer had known Ryder from his own time as a graduate philosophy student at Oxford. He credited Ryder with having coined the term and used it in the title of his book's fifth chapter: "Man's Dominion ... a short history of speciesism". Singer defined speciesism as "a prejudice or attitude of bias in favour of the interests of members of one's own species and against those of members of other species":

Racists violate the principle of equality by giving greater weight to the interests of members of their own race when there is a clash between their interests and the interests of those of another race. Sexists violate the principle of equality by favouring the interests of their own sex. Similarly, speciesists allow the interests of their own species to override the greater interests of members of other species. The pattern is identical in each case.

Singer argued from a preference-utilitarian perspective that speciesism violates the principle of equal consideration of interests, which he associated with Bentham's maxim that "each to count for one, and none for more than one". Singer argued that although there may be differences between humans and nonhumans, they share the capacity to suffer, and that similar suffering should receive equal consideration. Any position that allows similar cases to be treated differently, he wrote, fails as an acceptable moral theory. Singer wrote that the word was awkward but that he could not think of a better one. It became an entry in the Oxford English Dictionary in 1985, defined as "discrimination against or exploitation of animal species by human beings, based on an assumption of mankind's superiority." In 1994 the Oxford Dictionary of Philosophy offered a broader definition: "By analogy with racism and sexism, the improper stance of refusing respect to the lives, dignity, or needs of animals of other than the human species."

=== Anti-speciesism movement ===
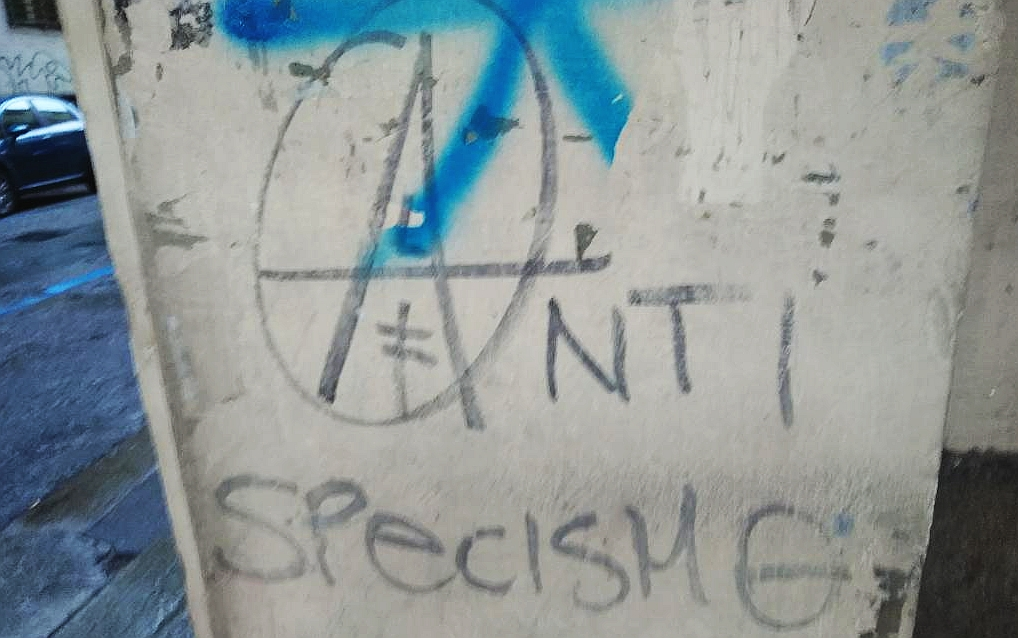
Anti-speciesism graffiti in Turin

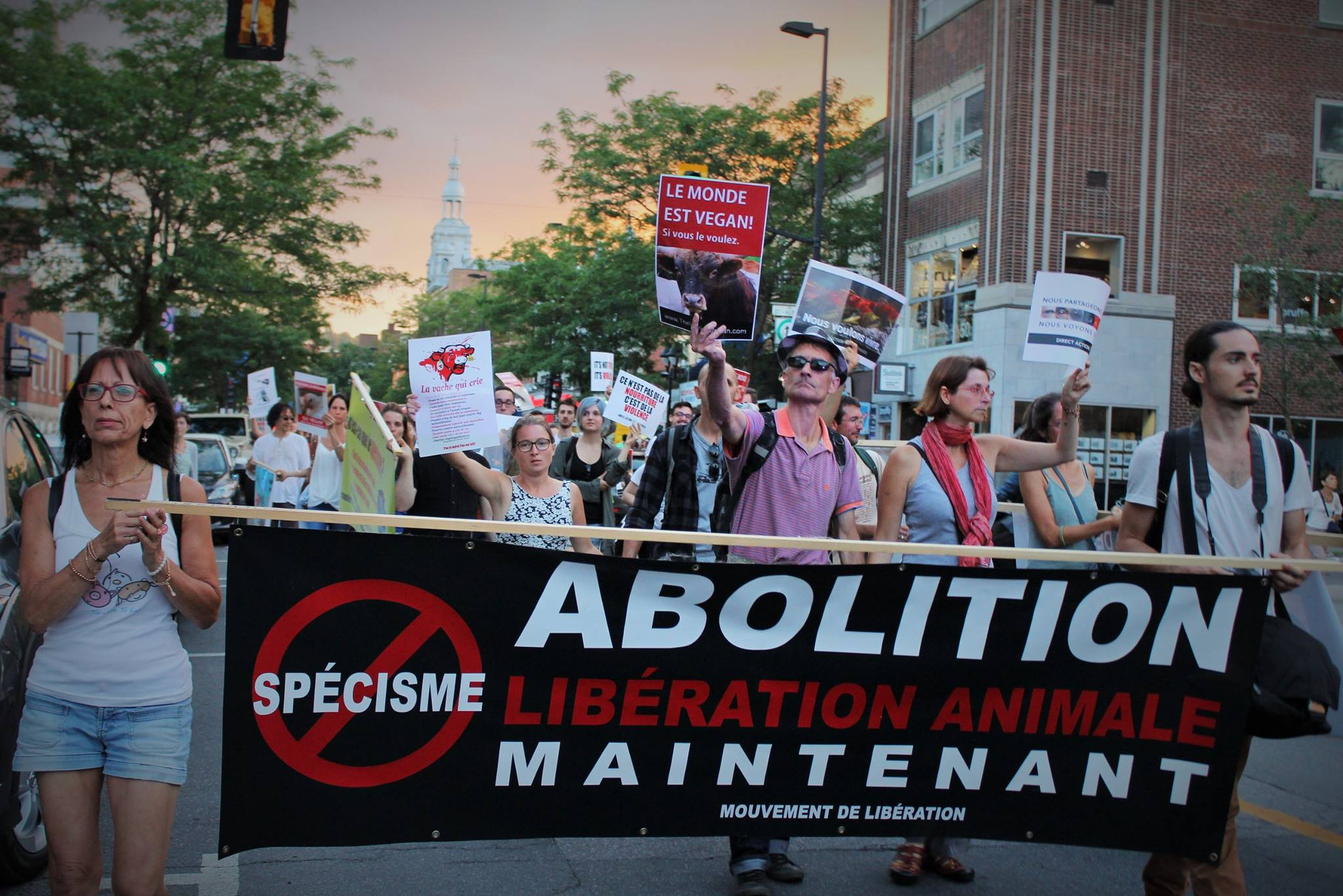
2015 anti-speciesism protest in Montreal

The French-language journal Cahiers antispécistes ("Antispeciesist notebooks") was founded in 1991 by David Olivier, Yves Bonnardel and Françoise Blanchon, who were among the first French activists to speak publicly against speciesism. The journal sought to disseminate anti-speciesist ideas in France and to encourage debate on animal ethics, particularly the difference between animal liberation and ecology. Estela Díaz and Oscar Horta write that in Spanish-speaking countries, unlike English-speaking countries, anti-speciesism has become the dominant approach in animal advocacy. In Italy, scholars have described two main tendencies in the contemporary anti-speciesist movement: a radical approach associated with authors such as Adriano Fragano, author of the "Antispeciesist Manifesto", and another more aligned with mainstream, neoliberal views.

People for the Ethical Treatment of Animals has lobbied vigorously against speciesism. During the 2021 mouse plague in Australia, a PETA spokesperson "pleaded with farmers to not kill the pests, arguing that exterminating them promoted the 'dangerous notion of human supremacy'... 'These bright, curious animals are just looking for food to survive'."

In the 21st century, animal rights groups such as the Farm Animal Rights Movement and People for the Ethical Treatment of Animals have promoted World Day Against Speciesism on 5 June. The World Day for the End of Speciesism (WoDES) is a similar annual observance held at the end of August. WoDES has been held annually since 2015.

== Social psychology ==
Scholars including philosopher Peter Singer and botanist Brent Mishler have compared speciesism with racism and sexism, arguing that all three involve giving unequal moral weight to individuals on the basis of group membership. Critics of the comparison argue that racism and sexism concern relations among human beings and differ in important ways from moral claims about nonhuman animals.

In the 2019 book Why We Love and Exploit Animals, Kristof Dhont, Gordon Hodson, Ana C. Leite, and Alina Salmen discuss psychological links between speciesism and other prejudices such as racism and sexism. Marjetka Golež Kaučič connects racism and speciesism, arguing that discrimination based on race and species is strongly interrelated and that human-rights discourse has provided part of the legal background for the development of animal-rights arguments. Kaučič further argues that racism and speciesism are connected to questions of freedom, both collective and individual.

In one study, 242 participants completed the Speciesism Scale; higher scores on this scale were associated with higher scores on measures of racism, sexism and homophobia. Other studies have found associations between support for animal exploitation and endorsement of racist or sexist views. Researchers have suggested that these relationships may be partly explained by social dominance orientation.

Psychologists have also studied speciesism as a measurable attitude, using Likert-scale instruments. These studies have found that speciesism is a relatively stable construct, varies between individuals, and correlates with political and personality variables. Speciesism has been reported to show weak positive correlations with homophobia and right-wing authoritarianism, and somewhat stronger correlations with political conservatism, racism and system justification. Moderate positive correlations have been found with social dominance orientation and sexism. Social dominance orientation has been proposed as an underlying factor in many of these correlations; controlling for it reduces all correlations substantially and makes many statistically insignificant. Speciesism has also been found to predict levels of prosociality toward animals and food choices.

Writers who regard speciesism as unfair to nonhuman animals have often discussed mammals and chickens in the context of research or farming. There is no generally agreed line within the movement about which species should be treated equally with humans, or should receive additional protection: mammals, birds, reptiles, arthropods, insects or other organisms. The issue is complicated by findings such as those of Miralles et al. (2019), who argued that human empathy and compassion tend to decrease with evolutionary distance; the more distant an organism is from humans, the less likely humans are to recognize themselves in it or to be moved by its fate.

Some researchers have argued that if speciesism is treated in social psychology as a form of prejudice, defined as an attitude, emotion or behaviour implying negativity or antipathy toward a group, then laypeople may perceive it as related to more familiar forms of prejudice. Research suggests that laypeople tend to infer similar traits and beliefs from a speciesist as they would from a racist, sexist or homophobe. It is less clear whether speciesism is linked with non-traditional forms of prejudice, such as negative attitudes towards overweight people or towards Christians.

Psychological studies have also argued that people tend to "morally value individuals of certain species less than others even when beliefs about intelligence and sentience are accounted for". One study identified age-related differences in moral views of animal worth, with children holding less speciesist beliefs than adults. The authors argued that these findings suggest that speciesist beliefs develop socially over an individual's lifetime.

== Relationship with the animal–industrial complex ==
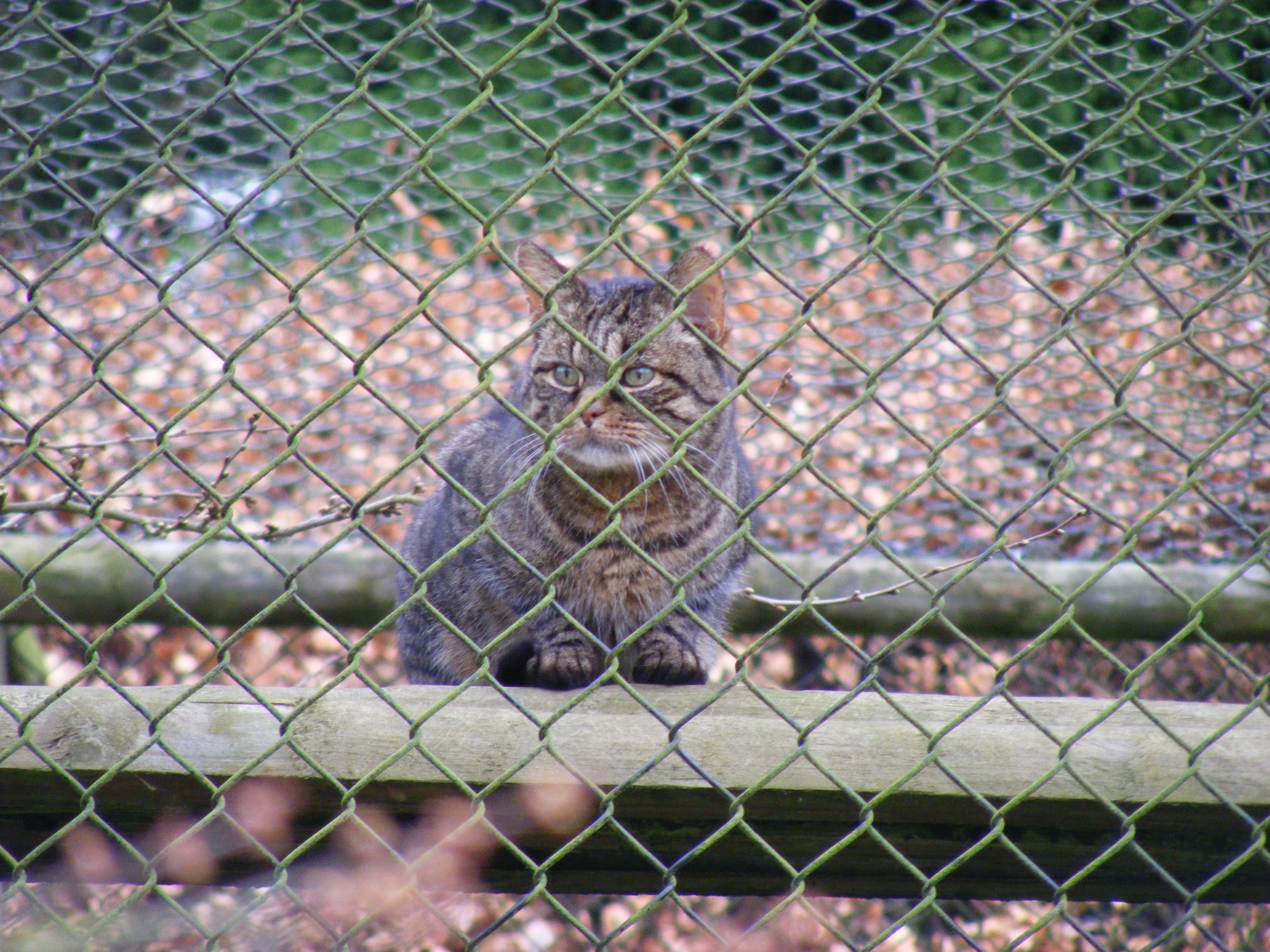
Even species of the same genus can receive differential treatment. It is not uncommon for African wildcats (pictured above) to be held in zoos, despite being of the same genus as domestic cats.

Piers Beirne considers speciesism the ideological basis of the animal–industrial complex, including factory farms, vivisection, hunting and fishing, zoos and aquaria, and wildlife trade. Amy Fitzgerald and Nik Taylor argue that the animal-industrial complex is both a consequence and a cause of speciesism, which they describe as a form of discrimination comparable to racism or sexism. They also argue that obscuring meat's animal origins is part of the animal-industrial complex under capitalist and neoliberal regimes. Speciesism is used in this literature to describe the belief that humans are entitled to use non-human animals.

Sociologist David Nibert states,

The profound cultural devaluation of other animals that permits the violence that underlies the animal industrial complex is produced by far-reaching speciesist socialization. For instance, the system of primary and secondary education under the capitalist system largely indoctrinates young people into the dominant societal beliefs and values, including a great deal of procapitalist and speciesist ideology. The devalued status of other animals is deeply ingrained; animals appear in schools merely as caged "pets", as dissection and vivisection subjects, and as lunch. On television and in movies, the unworthiness of other animals is evidenced by their virtual invisibility; when they do appear, they generally are marginalized, vilified, or objectified. Not surprisingly, these and numerous other sources of speciesism are so ideologically profound that those who raise compelling moral objections to animal oppression largely are dismissed, if not ridiculed.

Some scholars have argued that all forms of animal production are rooted in speciesism, because they reduce animals to economic resources. Built on the production and slaughter of animals, the animal-industrial complex has been described as the material form of speciesism, with speciesism becoming "a mode of production". In his 2011 book Critical Theory and Animal Liberation, J. Sanbonmatsu argues that speciesism is not simply ignorance or the absence of a moral code towards animals, but a mode of production and material system connected with capitalism.

== Arguments in favor ==
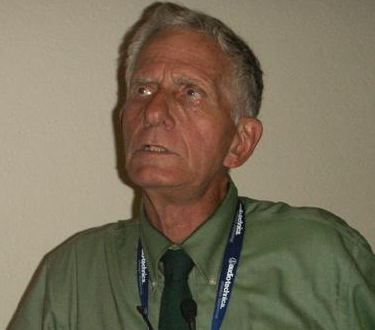
Defenders of speciesism such as Carl Cohen argue that speciesism is necessary for moral judgement.

Philosopher Carl Cohen stated in 1986: "Speciesism is not merely plausible; it is essential for right conduct, because those who will not make the morally relevant distinctions among species are almost certain, in consequence, to misapprehend their true obligations." Cohen writes that racism and sexism are wrong because there are no relevant differences between the sexes or races. Between people and animals, he states, there are significant differences; his view is that animals do not qualify for Kantian personhood, and as such have no rights.

Nel Noddings, the American feminist, has criticized Singer's concept of speciesism as too simple and as failing to take into account the context of species preference, as concepts of racism and sexism have taken into account the context of discrimination against humans. Peter Staudenmaier has argued that comparisons between speciesism and racism or sexism are trivializing:

The central analogy to the civil rights movement and the women's movement is trivializing and ahistorical. Both of those social movements were initiated and driven by members of the dispossessed and excluded groups themselves, not by benevolent men or white people acting on their behalf. Both movements were built precisely around the idea of reclaiming and reasserting a shared humanity in the face of a society that had deprived it and denied it. No civil rights activist or feminist ever argued, "We're sentient beings too!" They argued, "We're fully human too!" Animal liberation doctrine, far from extending this humanist impulse, directly undermines it.

A similar argument was made by Bernard Williams, who observed that a difference between speciesism on the one hand and racism and sexism on the other is that racists and sexists deny input from people of another race or sex when considering how they should be treated. By contrast, when the issue is how animals should be treated by humans, Williams observed that only humans can discuss the question. Williams also noted that being human is often used as an argument against discrimination on the grounds of race or sex, whereas racism and sexism are seldom used to counter discrimination.

Williams also argued in favour of speciesism, which he termed "humanism". He asked why properties grouped under "personhood" should be morally relevant to the destruction of a certain kind of animal while being human is not. Williams argued that to reply that these properties are valuable to human beings does not undermine speciesism, because human beings also value human beings. In his view, the only way to resolve this would be to argue that those properties are "simply better"; but then, he wrote, one must justify why they are better if not because of human attachment to them. Christopher Grau supported Williams, arguing that if properties such as rationality, sentience and moral agency are used as criteria for moral status instead of species membership, it must be shown why these properties should be used rather than others. Grau argues that saying they are simply better would require an impartial observer, an "enchanted picture of the universe", to establish them as such. He concludes that these properties have no greater justification as criteria for moral status than species membership does. Grau also argues that even if such an impartial perspective existed, it would not necessarily rule out speciesism, since an impartial observer might have reasons for humans to care about humanity. He further argues that if an impartial observer existed and valued only the minimization of suffering, it might be horrified by the suffering of all individuals and prefer humanity to end life on the planet rather than allow suffering to continue. Grau concludes that those who endorse values derived from an impartial observer do not appear to have seriously considered the consequences of such an idea.

Douglas Maclean agreed that Singer raised important questions and challenges, particularly with his argument from marginal cases. However, Maclean questioned whether different species can be fitted into human morality, noting that animals are generally held exempt from morality. Maclean writes that most people would try to stop a man kidnapping and killing a woman but would regard a hawk capturing and killing a marmot with awe and criticize anyone who tried to intervene. He suggests that morality makes most sense within human relations, and becomes less applicable the further it moves from them.

The British philosopher Roger Scruton regarded the emergence of the animal rights and anti-speciesism movement as "the strangest cultural shift within the liberal worldview". Scruton argued that rights and responsibilities are distinctive to the human condition and that it makes no sense to extend them beyond the human species. He argued that if animals have rights, then they also have duties, which animals would routinely violate, such as by breaking laws or killing other animals. He accused anti-speciesism advocates of "pre-scientific" anthropomorphism, attributing traits to animals that are, he said, Beatrix Potter-like, where "only man is vile". He described this as a fantasy, a world of escape.

Thomas Wells states that Singer's call for ending animal suffering would justify exterminating every animal on the planet in order to prevent future suffering, since they could no longer feel pain. Wells also argues that by focusing on the suffering humans inflict on animals and ignoring suffering animals inflict on one another or that results from nature, Singer creates a hierarchy in which some suffering matters more, despite claiming to be committed to equality of suffering. Wells further argues that the capacity to suffer, Singer's criterion for moral status, is a matter of degree rather than an absolute category. Wells observes that Singer denies moral status to plants on the grounds that they cannot subjectively feel anything, despite reacting to stimuli, and argues that there is no indication that nonhuman animals feel pain and suffering in the same way humans do.

Robert Nozick notes that if species membership is irrelevant, endangered animals would have no special claim.

The Rev. John Tuohey, founder of the Providence Center for Health Care Ethics, writes that the logic behind the anti-speciesism critique is flawed. He argues that although the animal rights movement in the United States has been influential in slowing animal experimentation and, in some cases, halting particular studies, no one has offered a compelling argument for species equality.

== Arguments against ==
=== Moral community, argument from marginal cases ===
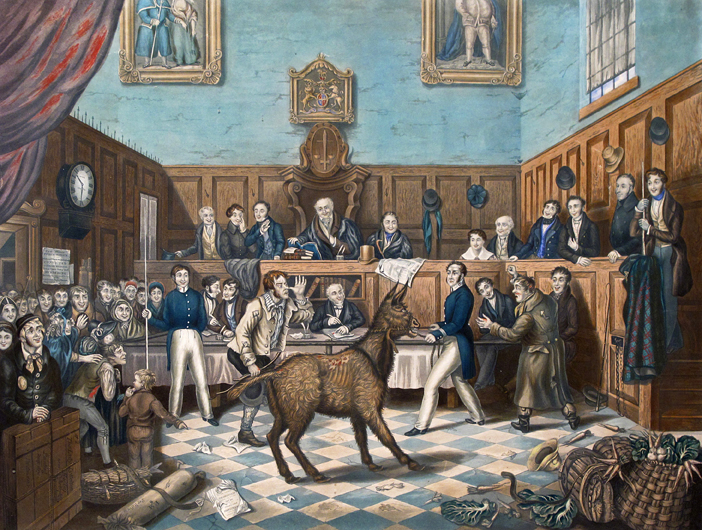
The Trial of Bill Burns (1838) in London showing Richard Martin in court with a donkey beaten by his owner, leading to Europe's first known conviction for animal cruelty

Paola Cavalieri writes that the current humanist paradigm treats only human beings as members of the moral community and as worthy of equal protection. Species membership, she writes, is ipso facto moral membership. The paradigm has an inclusive side, in which all human beings deserve equal protection, and an exclusive side, in which only human beings have that status.

Nonhumans have some moral status in many societies, but this generally extends only to protection against what Cavalieri calls "wanton cruelty". Anti-speciesists argue that extending moral membership to all humans, regardless of individual properties such as intelligence, while denying it to nonhumans, also regardless of individual properties, is internally inconsistent. According to the argument from marginal cases, if infants, the senile, the comatose and cognitively disabled humans have a certain moral status, then nonhuman animals must also receive that status, because there is no morally relevant capacity that all such humans have and all nonhumans lack.

American legal scholar Steven M. Wise states that speciesism is a bias as arbitrary as any other. He cites the philosopher R.G. Frey (1941–2012), a leading animal rights critic, who wrote in 1983 that, if forced to choose between abandoning experiments on animals and allowing experiments on "marginal-case" humans, he would choose the latter, "not because I begin a monster and end up choosing the monstrous, but because I cannot think of anything at all compelling that cedes all human life of any quality greater value than animal life of any quality."

=== "Discontinuous mind" ===
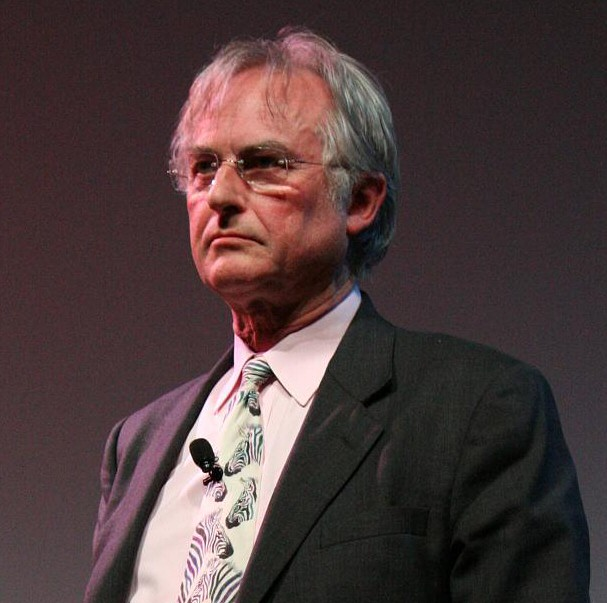
Richard Dawkins argues that speciesism is an example of the "discontinuous mind".

Richard Dawkins, the evolutionary biologist, wrote against speciesism in The Blind Watchmaker (1986), The Great Ape Project (1993), and The God Delusion (2006), connecting the issue with evolutionary theory. He compares former racist attitudes and assumptions to present-day speciesist counterparts. In the chapter "The one true tree of life" in The Blind Watchmaker, he states that the extinction of intermediate forms affects not only zoological taxonomy but also human ethics and law. Dawkins argues that what he calls the "discontinuous mind" is widespread, dividing the world into units that reflect human use of language, and animals into discontinuous species:

The director of a zoo is entitled to "put down" a chimpanzee that is surplus to requirements, while any suggestion that he might "put down" a redundant keeper or ticket-seller would be greeted with howls of incredulous outrage. The chimpanzee is the property of the zoo. Humans are nowadays not supposed to be anybody's property, yet the rationale for discriminating against chimpanzees is seldom spelled out, and I doubt if there is a defensible rationale at all. Such is the breathtaking speciesism of our Christian-inspired attitudes, the abortion of a single human zygote (most of them are destined to be spontaneously aborted anyway) can arouse more moral solicitude and righteous indignation than the vivisection of any number of intelligent adult chimpanzees! ... The only reason we can be comfortable with such a double standard is that the intermediates between humans and chimps are all dead.

Dawkins elaborated in a discussion with Singer at The Center for Inquiry in 2007 when asked whether he continues to eat meat: "It's a little bit like the position which many people would have held a couple of hundred years ago over slavery. Where lots of people felt morally uneasy about slavery but went along with it because the whole economy of the South depended upon slavery."

=== Centrality of consciousness ===
"Libertarian extension" is the idea that the intrinsic value of nature can be extended beyond sentient beings. It seeks to apply the principle of individual rights not only to all animals but also to objects without a nervous system, such as trees, plants and rocks. Ryder rejects this argument, writing that "value cannot exist in the absence of consciousness or potential consciousness. Thus, rocks and rivers and houses have no interests and no rights of their own. This does not mean, of course, that they are not of value to us, and to many other [beings who experience pain], including those who need them as habitats and who would suffer without them."

=== Comparisons to the Holocaust ===
David Sztybel states in his paper, "Can the Treatment of Animals Be Compared to the Holocaust?" (2006), that the racism of the Nazis is comparable to the speciesism inherent in eating meat or using animal by-products, particularly those produced on factory farms. Y. Michael Barilan, an Israeli physician, states that speciesism is not the same as Nazi racism, because the latter extolled the abuser and condemned the weaker and the abused. He describes speciesism as the recognition of rights on the basis of group membership, rather than solely on the basis of moral considerations.

== Law and policy ==
=== Law ===
The first major statute addressing animal protection in the United States, titled "An Act for the More Effectual Prevention of Cruelty to Animals", was enacted in 1867. It provided legal means to prosecute acts of animal cruelty. The act, which has since been revised state by state, originally addressed animal neglect, abandonment, torture, fighting, transport, impound standards and licensing standards. Although an animal rights movement had already begun by the late 19th century, some of the laws that would shape the treatment of animals as industry grew were enacted around the same period that Richard Ryder was introducing the concept of speciesism. In the United States, the Humane Slaughter Act, intended to reduce suffering during slaughter, was passed in 1958. The Animal Welfare Act of 1966, passed by the 89th United States Congress and signed into law by President Lyndon B. Johnson, introduced stricter regulations on the handling of animals used in laboratory experimentation and exhibition, and has since been amended and expanded.

=== Great ape personhood ===
Great ape personhood is the idea that the attributes of non-human great apes are such that their sentience and personhood should be recognized by law, rather than their being protected only as a group under animal cruelty legislation. Awarding personhood to nonhuman primates would require their individual interests to be taken into account.

== Observances ==
The World Day for the End of Speciesism (WoDES) is an international event intended to denounce speciesism, held annually at the end of August since 2015. The observance was initiated in 2015 by members of the Swiss association Pour l'Egalité Animale (PEA), which coordinates the international day annually.

The World Day Against Speciesism is observed annually on June 5.

== Films and television series with themes around speciesism ==
- Planet of the Apes (1968–present)
- The Animals Film (1981)
- Enemy Mine (1985)
- A Cow at My Table (1998)
- Meet Your Meat (2002)
- Earthlings (2005)
- Behind the Mask (2006)
- Over the Hedge (2006)
- District 9 (2009)
- Peaceable Kingdom: The Journey Home (2009)
- The Cove (2009)
- The Superior Human? (2012)
- Speciesism: The Movie (2013)
- BoJack Horseman (2014)
- The Long Way to a Small, Angry Planet (2014)
- Unity (2015)
- Zootopia (2016)
- The Promised Neverland (2016)
- Carnage (2017)
- Eating Animals (2018)
- Dominion (2018)
- Beastars (2019)
- Buck Breaking (2021)
- Star Wars (1977–present) – in side threads

== See also ==
- Animal trial
- Antinaturalism (politics)
- Biocentrism
- Carnism
- Critical animal studies
- Deep ecology
- Ecocentrism
- Earth jurisprudence
- Genetic fallacy
- Humanism
- Moral circle expansion
- Sentientism
- Vegan studies
- Veganism
- Wild Law

== Sources ==
- Best, Steven (2014). The Politics of Total Liberation: Revolution for the 21st Century. Palgrave Macmillan. ISBN 978-1137471116.
- Caviola, L.; Everett, J. A. & Faber, N. S. (2018). "The moral standing of animals: Towards a psychology of speciesism". Journal of Personality and Social Psychology, dx.doi.org/10.1037/pspp0000182.
- Cohen, Carl (1986). "The case for the use of animals in biomedical research" (PDF). The New England Journal of Medicine. 315 (14): 865–869. doi:10.1056/nejm198610023151405. PMID 3748104. S2CID 20009545.
- Cohen, Carl and Regan, Tom (2001). The Animal Rights Debate, Rowman & Littlefield Publishers.
- Dawkins, Richard (1996) [1986]. The Blind Watchmaker, W. W. Norton & Company, Inc.
- Dhont, K.; Hodson, G. & Leite, A. (2016). "Common Ideological Roots of Speciesism and Generalized Ethnic Prejudice: The Social Dominance Human–Animal Relations Model (SD-HARM". European Journal of Personality, doi.org/10.1002/per.2069.
- Diamond, Cora (2004). "Eating Meat and Eating People," in Cass Sunstein and Martha Nussbaum (eds.), Animal Rights: Current Debates and New Directions, Oxford University Press.
- Everett, J.; Caviola, L.; Savulescu, J.; Faber, N. (2019). "Speciesism, generalized prejudice, and perceptions of prejudiced others". Group Processes & Intergroup Relations. 22 (6): 785–803. doi:10.1177/1368430218816962. PMC 6732816. PMID 31588179.
- Fernández-Armesto, Felipe (2003). Ideas that changed the world, Dorling Kindersley.
- Frey, R. G. (1983). Rights, Killing and Suffering, Blackwell.
- Graft, D (1997). "Against strong speciesism". Journal of Applied Philosophy. 14 (2): 107–118. doi:10.1111/1468-5930.00047.
- Gray, J. A. (1990). "In defense of speciesism". Behavioral and Brain Sciences. 13 (1): 22–23. doi:10.1017/S0140525X00077256. S2CID 147194800.
- Green, Michael S.(2015) "Animal Rights Movement." Ideas and Movements that shaped America: From the Bill of Right to Occupy Wall Street, pp. 44–47.
- Holden, Andrew (2003). "In Need of New Environmental Ethics for Tourism?". Annals of Tourism Research. 30 (1): 94–108. doi:10.1016/s0160-7383(02)00030-0.
- Karcher, Karin (2009) [1998]. "Great Ape Project," in Marc Bekoff (ed.), Encyclopedia of Animal Rights and Animal Welfare, Greenwood.
- Lafollette, Hugh and Shanks, Niall (1996). "The Origin of Speciesism", Philosophy, 71(275), January, pp. 41–61 (courtesy link).
- Noddings, Nel (1991). "Comment on Donovan's 'Animal Rights and Feminist Theory'", Signs, 16(2), Winter, pp. 418–422.
- Ryder, Richard D. (1971). "Experiments on Animals," in Stanley and Roslind Godlovitch and John Harris (eds.), Animals, Men and Morals, Victor Gollanz, pp. 41–82.
- Rorty, Richard (1998) [1993]. "Human rights, rationality and sentimentality," in Truth and Progress, Cambridge University Press.
- Scully, Matthew (2003). Dominion: The Power of Man, the Suffering of Animals, and the Call to Mercy, St. Martin's Griffin.
- Singer, Peter (1990) [First edition published 1975]. Animal Liberation. New York: Random House.
- Staudenmaier, Peter (2003). "Ambiguities of Animal Rights", Communalism: International Journal for a Rational Society, March, 5.
- Sztybel, David (2006). "Can the Treatment of Animals Be Compared to the Holocaust?", Ethics & the Environment, 11(1), Spring, pp. 97–132.
- Tuohey, John (1992). "Fifteen years after Animal Liberation: Has the animal rights movement achieved philosophical legitimacy?", Journal of Medical Humanities, 13(2), June, pp. 79–89.
- Vardy, P. and Grosch, P. (1999). The Puzzle of Ethics, Harper Collins.
- Wise, Steven M. (2004). "Animal Rights, One Step at a Time," in Cass Sunstein and Martha Nussbaum eds.), Animal Rights: Current Debates and New Directions, Oxford University Press.
- Zamir, Tzachi (2009). Ethics and the Beast: A Speciesist Argument for Animal Liberation. Princeton University Press.
