= Tom Regan =

American philosopher and animal rights scholar (1938–2017)

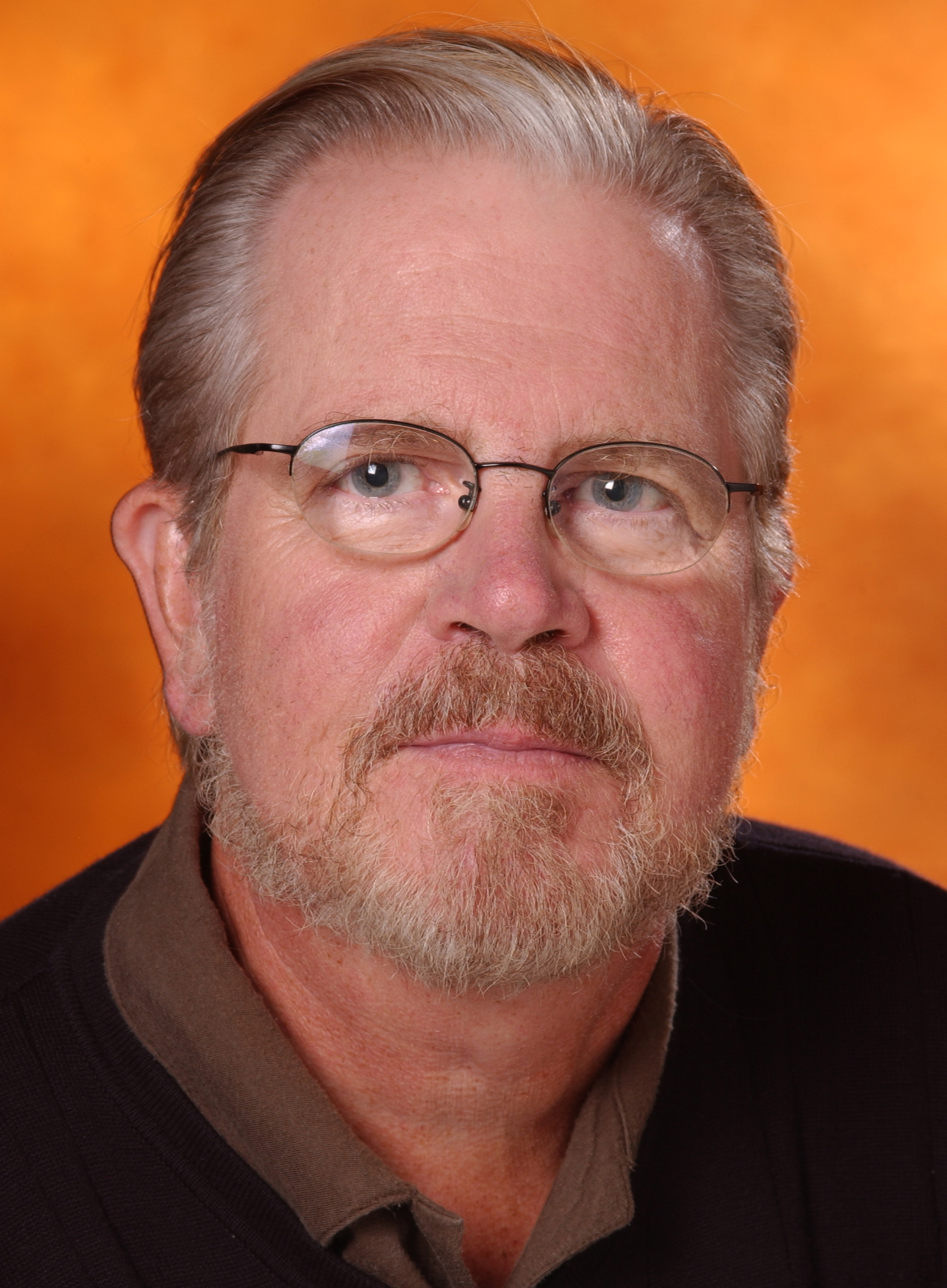
- Regan in 2004
- Born: November 28, 1938; Pittsburgh, Pennsylvania, U.S.
- Died: February 17, 2017 (aged 78); Raleigh, North Carolina, U.S.
- Spouse: Nancy Tirk
- Children: 2

Education
- Education: Thiel College (B.A.); University of Virginia (M.A., PhD)

Philosophical work
- Era: Contemporary philosophy
- Region: Western philosophy
- School: Analytic philosophy
- Institutions: North Carolina State University
- Main interests: Animal rights theory and advocacy
- Notable works: The Case for Animal Rights (1983)
- Notable ideas: Concept of "subject-of-a-life"
- Website: regan.animalsvoice.com

Tom Regan (/ˈreɪɡən/; November 28, 1938 – February 17, 2017) was an American philosopher who specialized in animal rights theory. He was professor emeritus of philosophy at North Carolina State University, where he had taught from 1967 until his retirement in 2001.

Regan was the author of numerous books on the philosophy of animal rights, including The Case for Animal Rights (1983), one of a handful of studies that have significantly influenced the modern animal rights movement. In these, he argued that non-human animals are what he called the "subjects-of-a-life", just as humans are, and that, if we want to ascribe value to all human beings regardless of their ability to be rational agents, then to be consistent, we must similarly ascribe it to non-humans.

From 1985, Regan served with his wife Nancy as co-founder and co-president of the Culture and Animals Foundation, a nonprofit organization "committed to fostering the growth of intellectual and artistic endeavors united by a positive concern for animals". The Vegan Society remembers him as "a stalwart vegan and activist".

== Education and career ==
Regan graduated with a B.A. from Thiel College in 1960, receiving his M.A. in 1962 and his PhD in 1966 from the University of Virginia. He taught philosophy at North Carolina State University from 1967 until 2001. In 2001 Regan worked with the NC State University Libraries to help establish the Tom Regan Archives, the first US archive focused on animal rights. Regan directed the 1986 film We Are All Noah. The film, taking on a more interesting twist on the film industry, and notable for its cinematography.'

== Personal life ==
Regan and his wife Nancy had two children. Regan died of pneumonia at his home in North Carolina on February 17, 2017.

Regan's papers including correspondence, research files and audiovisual materials are stored at the Special Collections Research Center in NC State University Libraries. The Special Collections Research Center at NC State University set up an annual fellowship in memory of Regan.

== Selected works ==
=== Books ===
- Understanding Philosophy. Encino, California: Dickenson Publishing Co. 1975. ISBN 978-0822101222.
- Animal Rights and Human Obligations; with Peter Singer. Englewood Cliffs: New Jersey: Prentice Hall. 1976. ISBN 978-0130375315
- All That Dwell Therein: Essays on Animal Rights and Environmental Ethics. Berkeley: University of California Press. 1982. ISBN 978-0520045712.
- The Case for Animal Rights. Berkeley: University of California Press. 1983. ISBN 978-0520049048.
- Animal Sacrifices: Religious Perspectives on the Use of Animals in Science. Philadelphia: Temple University Press. 1986. ISBN 978-0877224112.
- Bloomsbury's Prophet: G. E. Moore and the Development of His Moral Philosophy. Philadelphia: Temple University Press. 1986. ISBN 978-0877224464.
- G. E. Moore: The Early Essays, edited by Tom Regan. Philadelphia: Temple University Press. 1986. ISBN 978-0877224426.
- The Struggle for Animal Rights. Clarks Summit, Pennsylvania: International Society for Animal Rights. 1987. ISBN 978-0960263219.
- The Thee Generation: Reflections on the Coming Revolution. Philadelphia: Temple University Press. 1991. ISBN 978-0877227724.
- G. E. Moore: The Elements of Ethics; edited and with an introduction by Tom Regan. Philadelphia: Temple University Press. 1991. ISBN 978-0877227700.
- Animal Others: On Ethics, Ontology, and Animal Life; with H. Peter Steeves. State University of New York Press. 1999.
- Defending Animal Rights. Illinois: University of Illinois Press. 2000. ISBN 978-0252026119.
- The Animal Rights Debate; with Carl Cohen. Lanham, Maryland: Rowman & Littlefield. 2001. ISBN 978-0847696635.
- Animal Rights, Human Wrongs: An Introduction to Moral Philosophy. Lanham, Maryland: Rowman & Littlefield. 2003. ISBN 978-0742533547.
- Empty Cages: Facing the Challenge of Animal Rights. Lanham, Maryland: Rowman & Littlefield. 2004. ISBN 978-0742533523.
- Other Nations: Animals in Modern Literature; with Andrew Linzey. Waco, Texas: Baylor University Press. 2010. ISBN 978-1602582378.
- Maud's Place and Other Southern Stories. Morrisville, North Carolina: Lulu Press Inc. 2014. ISBN 978-1304292544.
- A Better Life and Other Pittsburgh Stories. Morrisville, North Carolina: Lulu Press Inc. 2014. ISBN 978-1304292339.

=== Films ===
- We Are All Noah (1986)
- Voices I Have Heard (1988)

=== Papers ===
- Regan, Tom (1975). "The Moral Basis of Vegetarianism". Canadian Journal of Philosophy. 5 (2): 181–214. doi:10.1080/00455091.1975.10716107. S2CID 170170900.

== See also ==
- Animal liberationist
- Animal liberation movement
- Argument from marginal cases
- Gary Francione
- Intrinsic value (animal ethics)
- List of American philosophers
- List of animal rights advocates
- Peter Singer
