= Ethics of eating meat =

Food ethics topic

Conversations regarding the ethics of eating meat are focused on whether or not it is moral to eat non-human animals. People who abstain from eating meat are generally known as vegetarians and people who avoid all animal by-products are known as vegans. They avoid meat for a variety of reasons, including taste preference, animal welfare, ethical reasons, religion, the environmental impact of meat production (environmental vegetarianism), health considerations, and antimicrobial resistance. Individuals who promote meat consumption do so for a number of reasons, such as health, cultural traditions, religious beliefs, and scientific arguments that support the practice. The majority of the world’s health and dietetics associations state that a well-planned vegetarian or vegan diet can be nutritionally adequate for all stages of life.

A common argument used in the animal rights movement is the argument from marginal cases, asserting that non-human animals should have the moral status similar to that of marginal case human beings such as human infants, the senile, the comatose, and the cognitively disabled. Proponents argue that there are no morally relevant traits that these marginal humans possess that animals lack.

In addition to flesh, vegans also abstain from other animal products, such as dairy products, honey and eggs, for similar reasons. "Ethical omnivores" are individuals who object to the practices underlying the production of meat, as opposed to the act of consuming meat itself. They do not believe animals deserve the right not to be killed and treated as commodities, but rather, they believe it is permissible to kill them as long as welfare is taken into account. In this respect, many people who abstain from certain kinds of meat eating and animal products do not take issue with meat consumption in general, provided that the meat and animal products are produced in a specific manner. Ethical omnivores may object to rearing animals for meat in factory farms, killing animals in ways that cause pain, and feeding animals unnecessary antibiotics or hormones. To this end, they may avoid meats such as veal, foie gras, meat from animals that were not free range, animals that were fed antibiotics or hormones, etc.

In a 2014 survey of 406 US philosophy professors, approximately 60% of ethicists and 45% of non-ethicist philosophers said it was at least somewhat "morally bad" to eat meat from mammals. A 2020 survey of 1,812 published English-language philosophers found that 48% said it was permissible to eat animals in ordinary circumstances, while 45% said it was not. The World Scientists' Warning to Humanity (2017), the most co-signed scientific journal article in history, called (among other things) for a transition to plant-based diets in order to combat climate change.

== Overview of arguments for and against meat eating ==
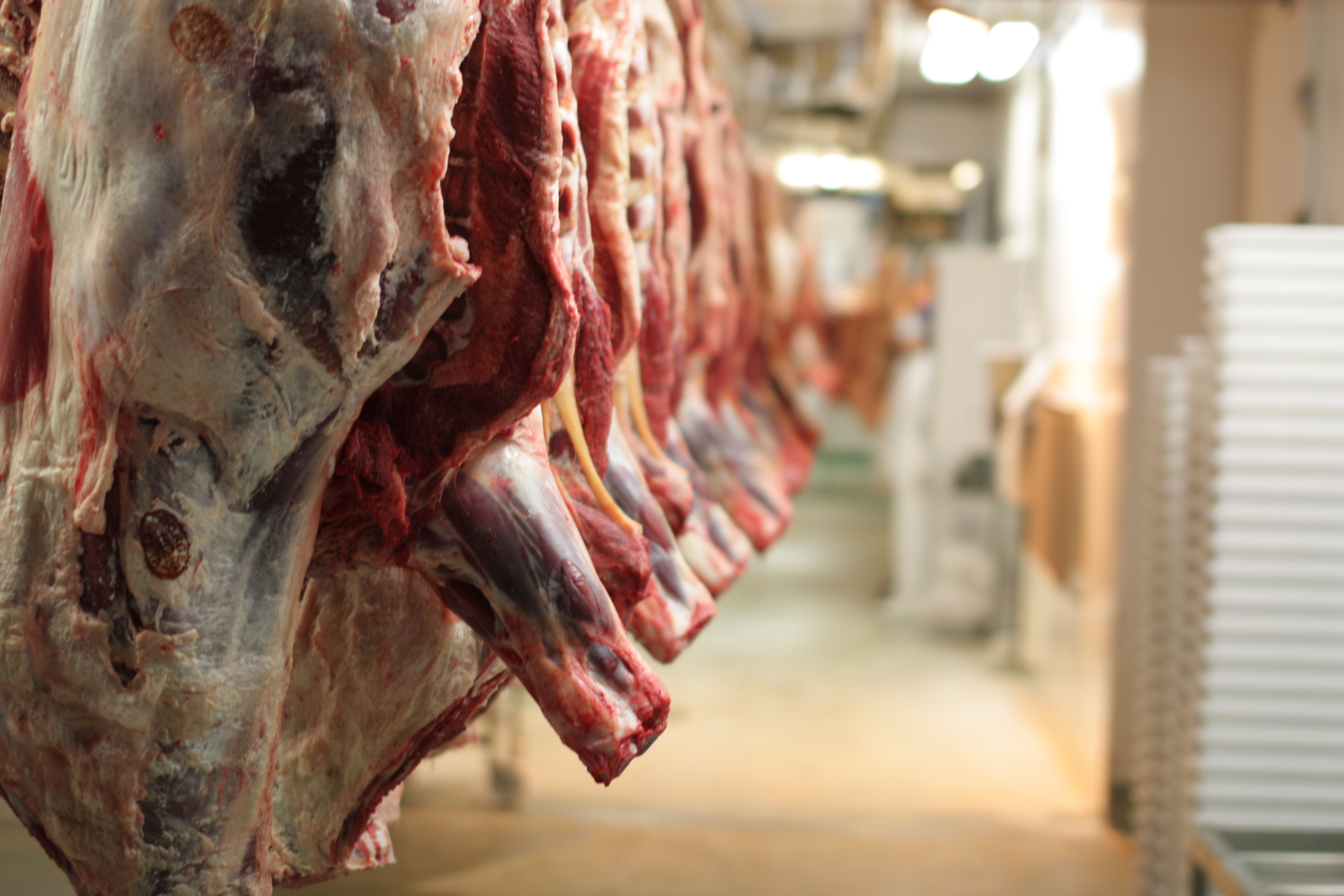
Cattle carcasses in a slaughterhouse

Conversations regarding the ethics of meat eating have been ongoing for thousands of years, possibly longer. Pythagoras, a Greek mathematician and philosopher who lived during the 6th century BC, made the case against eating animals on grounds of their having souls like humans. Taking an entirely different approach, Plato, an Athenian philosopher who lived during the 4th century BC, argued that meat is a luxury item that requires a lot of land to procure. As a result, he stated that the unmoderated consumption of meat would lead to conflict over land and, ultimately, an unsustainable society. Xenophon expressed similar concerns to Plato:

"Aye, and when others pray for a good wheat harvest, he, presumably, would pray for a good meat supply." The young man, guessing that these remarks of Socrates applied to him, did not stop eating his meat, but took some bread with it. When Socrates observed this, he cried: "Watch the fellow, you who are near him, and see whether he treats the bread as his meat or the meat as his bread."

— Xenophon, Memorabilia, book 3, chapter 14

Plutarch, a Middle Platonist philosopher and vegetarian, dedicated a section of his Moralia to the consumption of animals. He argued that flesh-eating is not a necessity but a luxury rooted in gluttony and desensitization to violence. He emphasized the cruelty of killing animals for pleasure, contrasting it with the simplicity and sufficiency of plant-based sustenance. Furthermore, Plutarch argued that, since there was a possibility that souls could migrate from human bodies to animal bodies after death, that human and animal lives should be beholden to the same standard of care:

"Kill it! It's only a brute beast"; but the other says, "Stop! What if the soul of some relative or friend has found its way into this body?" — Good God! Of course the risk is equal or much the same in the two cases — if I refuse to eat flesh, or if I, disbelieving, kill my child or some other relative!"

— Plutarch, Moralia,

René Descartes, a 17th-century French philosopher, mathematician, and scientist, disagreed with the aforementioned stances. He argued that animals were not conscious. As a result, he asserted that there is nothing ethically wrong with consuming meat or causing animals physical pain. Immanuel Kant also argued that there is nothing ethically wrong with meat consumption. He claimed that it was personhood that distinguished humans from animals and that, since animals are not actual persons, there was nothing wrong with killing or consuming them.

Peter Singer, a Princeton University and University of Melbourne professor and pioneer of the animal liberation movement, argues that, because non-human animals feel, they should be treated according to utilitarian ethics. In his ethical philosophy of what it is to be a "person", Singer ultimately argues that livestock animals feel enough to deserve better treatment than they receive. Singer's work has since been widely built upon by philosophers who agree and who do not. His essential philosophies have been largely adopted by animal rights advocates as well as by ethical vegetarians and vegans.

Many other modern thinkers have questioned the morality not only of the double standard underlying speciesism but also the double standard underlying the fact that people support treatment of cows, pigs, and chickens in ways that they would never allow with pet dogs, cats, or birds.

Nick Zangwill, a British philosopher and honorary research professor at University College London and Lincoln University, disagrees with Singer's conclusions about the moral necessity of not eating meat. In Our Moral Duty to Eat Meat, which was published by Cambridge University Press, Zangwill argues that the existence of domesticated animals depends on the practice of eating them, and that meat eating has historically benefitted many millions of animals and given them good lives. Consequently, he claims that eating non-human animal meat is not merely permissible but also good for many millions of animals. However, Zangwill clarifies that this argument does not apply to factory farm animals, as they do not have good lives. Thus, when he speaks of meat eating being justified, he means only meat from animals that overall have a good life. Proponents of meat eating who subscribe to Zangwill's views argue that practices like well-managed free-range rearing and the consumption of hunted animals, particularly from species whose natural predators have been significantly eliminated, could satisfy the demand for mass-produced, ethically sourced meat.

Ethical vegetarians say that the reasons for not hurting or killing animals are similar to the reasons for not hurting or killing humans. They argue that killing an animal, like killing a human, can only be justified in extreme circumstances, such as when one's life is threatened. Consuming a living creature just for its taste, for convenience, or out of habit is not justifiable. Some ethicists have added that humans, unlike other animals, are morally conscious of their behavior and have a choice; this is why there are laws governing human behavior, and why it is subject to moral standards. Ethical vegetarian concerns have become more widespread in developed countries, particularly because of the spread of factory farming, more open and graphic documentation of what human meat-eating entails for the animal, and environmental consciousness. Reducing the worldwide massive food waste would also contribute to reduce meat waste and therefore save animals.

Some have described unequal treatment of humans and animals as a form of speciesism such as anthropocentrism or human-centeredness. Val Plumwood (1993, 1996) has argued that anthropocentrism plays a role in green theory that is analogous to androcentrism in feminist theory and ethnocentrism in anti-racist theory. Plumwood calls human-centredness "anthropocentrism" to emphasize this parallel. By analogy with racism and sexism, Melanie Joy has dubbed meat-eating "carnism". The animal rights movement seeks an end to the rigid moral and legal distinction drawn between human and non-human animals, an end to the status of animals as property, and an end to their use in the research, food, clothing, and entertainment industries.

== Animal consciousness ==
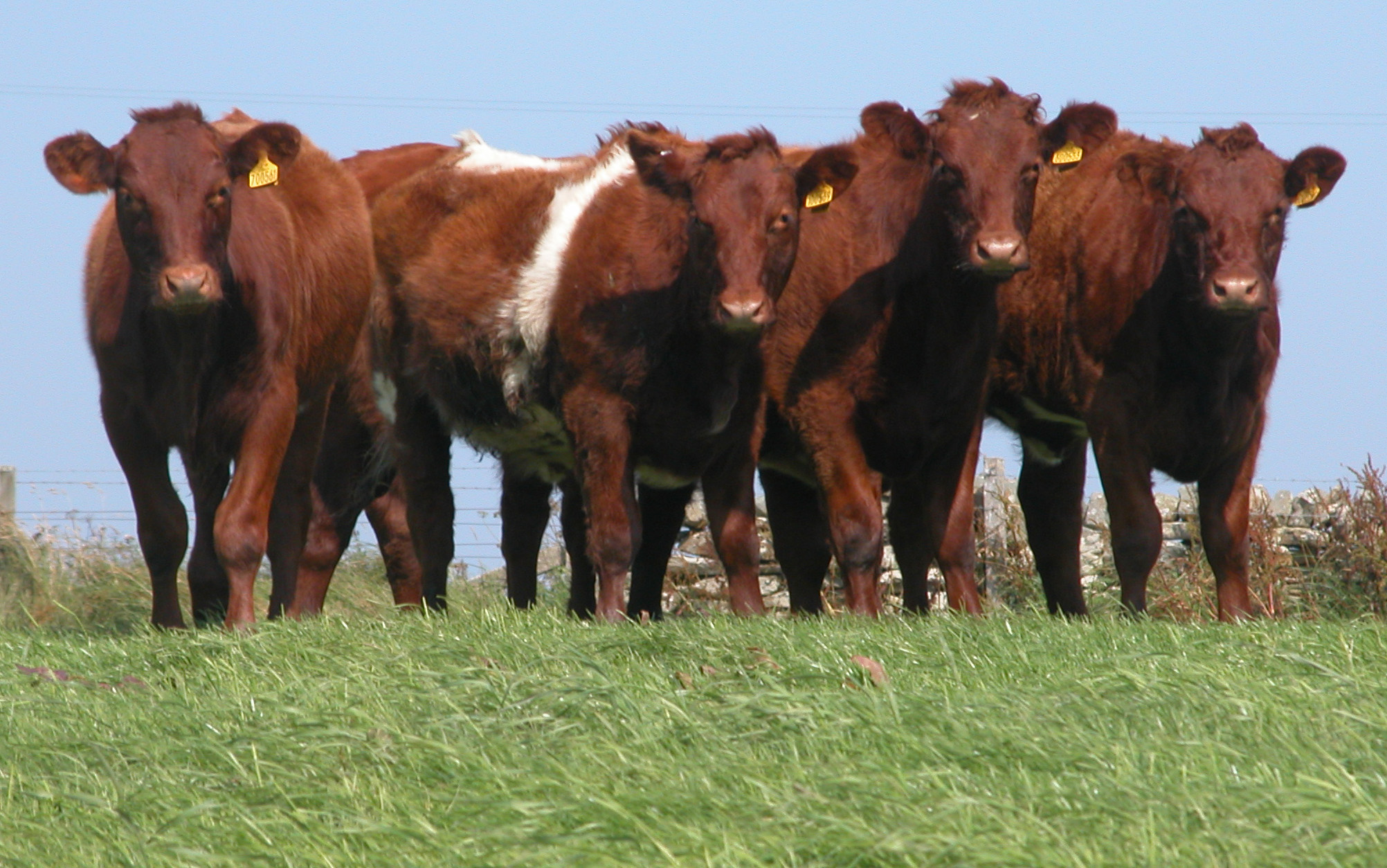
Shorthorn heifers, a typical multipurpose breed of cattle

Jane Goodall, an ethologist, stated in the 2009 book The Inner World of Farm Animals that "farm animals feel pleasure and sadness, excitement and resentment, depression, fear, and pain. They are much more sensitive and intelligent than we ever imagined." In 2012, a group of well known neuroscientists stated in the "Cambridge Declaration on Consciousness in Non-Human Animals" that all mammals and birds (such as farm animals), and other animals, possess the neurological substrates that generate consciousness and are able to experience affective states.

Eugene Linden, author of The Parrot's Lament, suggests that many examples of animal behavior and intelligence seem to indicate both emotion and a level of consciousness that we would normally ascribe only to our own species. Philosopher Daniel Dennett counters:

Consciousness requires a certain kind of informational organization that does not seem to be "hard-wired" in humans, but is instilled by human culture. Moreover, consciousness is not a black-or-white, all-or-nothing type of phenomenon, as is often assumed. The differences between humans and other species are so great that speculations about animal consciousness seem ungrounded. Many authors simply assume that an animal like a bat has a point of view, but there seems to be little interest in exploring the details involved.

Philosophers Peter Singer (Princeton), Jeff McMahan (Oxford) and others also counter that the issue is not one of consciousness, but of sentience.

=== Pain ===
A related argument revolves around non-human organisms' ability to feel pain. If animals could be shown to suffer, as humans do, then many of the arguments against human suffering could be extended to animals. One such reaction is transmarginal inhibition, a phenomenon observed in humans and some animals akin to mental breakdown. John Webster, emeritus professor of animal husbandry at the University of Bristol, observed:

People have assumed that intelligence is linked to the ability to suffer and that because animals have smaller brains they suffer less than humans. That is a pathetic piece of logic, sentient animals have the capacity to experience pleasure and are motivated to seek [it. One] only [has] to watch how cows and lambs both seek and enjoy pleasure when they lie with their heads raised to the sun on a perfect English summer's [day, just] like humans.

Various programs operate around the world that promote the notion that animals raised for food can be treated humanely. Some spokespeople for the factory farming industry argue that the animals are better off in total confinement. F J "Sonny" Faison, president of Carroll's Foods, stated:

They're in state-of-the-art confinement facilities. The conditions that we keep these animals in are much more humane than when they were out in the field. Today they're in housing that is environmentally controlled in many respects. And the feed is right there for them all the time, and water, fresh water. They're looked after in some of the best conditions, because the healthier and [more] content that animal, the better it grows. So we're very interested in their well-being up to an extent.

In response, animal welfare advocates ask for evidence that any factory-bred animal is better off caged than free. Farm Sanctuary argues that commodifying and slaughtering animals is incompatible with the definition of "humane". Animal ethicists such as Gary Francione have argued that reducing animal suffering is not enough; it needs to be made illegal and abolished. Steven Best also challenges this notion, and argues that factory farm conditions "resemble the mechanized production lines of concentration camps" where animals are "forced to produce maximal quantities of meat, milk, and eggs—an intense coercion that takes place through physical confinement but also now through chemical and genetic manipulation. As typical in Nazi compounds, this forced and intensive labor terminates in death." David Nibert says that sentient animals are treated as mere inanimate objects and "biomachines" in factory farms, or CAFOs, where they are often confined in darkness with no opportunity for engaging in natural activity, are mutilated to prevent pathological behaviors in overcrowded conditions, and genetically manipulated to the point where many cannot even stand. David Benatar contends that of the 63 billion land animals killed annually to provide humans with meat products, the vast majority of them die painful and stressful deaths. He said:

Broiler chickens and spent layer hens are suspended upside down on conveyor belts and have their throats slit. Pigs and other animals are beaten and shocked to coax them to move along in the slaughterhouses, where their throats are cut or stabbed, sometimes after stunning but sometimes not.

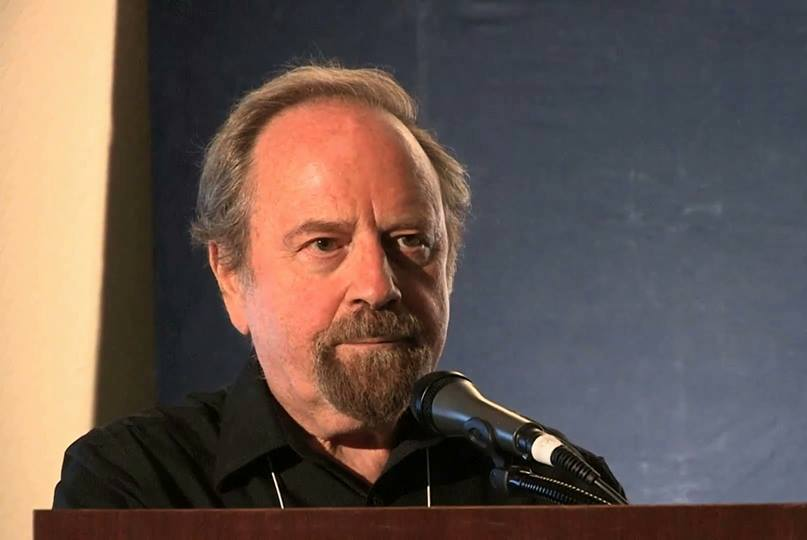
Vegan Holocaust survivor Alex Hershaft (pictured) has compared the treatment of livestock to the Holocaust, and stated that the reason he survived was to end the oppression of animals.

Writing in Current Affairs, Nathan J. Robinson describes the billions of non-human animals that suffer and die at the hands of human beings for consumption as a "holocaust" and, citing Jeremy Bentham's formulation "The question is not, Can they reason? nor, Can they talk? but, Can they suffer?" contends that it is "morally reprehensible" and "deeply wrong". Conversely, Jan Narveson argues that under certain theories of utilitarianism, positive utility can be increased by having more living organisms to experience it and thus by increasing the animal population so it can later be eaten, these theories could potentially justify raising animals for the purposes of consumption. Critics of ethical vegetarianism say that there is no agreement on where to draw the line between organisms that can and cannot feel. Justin Leiber, a philosophy professor at Oxford University, writes:

Montaigne is ecumenical in this respect, claiming consciousness for spiders and ants, and even writing of our duties to trees and plants. Singer and Clarke agree in denying consciousness to sponges. Singer locates the distinction somewhere between the shrimp and the oyster. He, with rather considerable convenience for one who is thundering hard accusations at others, slides by the case of insects and spiders and bacteria, they pace Montaigne, apparently and rather conveniently do not feel pain. The intrepid Midgley, on the other hand, seems willing to speculate about the subjective experience of tapeworms ... Nagel ... appears to draw the line at flounders and wasps, though more recently he speaks of the inner life of cockroaches.

There are some who argue that, although only suffering animals feel anguish, plants, like all organisms, have evolved mechanisms for survival. No living organism can be described as "wanting" to die for another organism's sustenance. In an article written for The New York Times, Carol Kaesuk Yoon argues:

When a plant is wounded, its body immediately kicks into protection mode. It releases a bouquet of volatile chemicals, which in some cases have been shown to induce neighboring plants to pre-emptively step up their own chemical defenses and in other cases to lure in predators of the beasts that may be causing the damage to the plants. Inside the plant, repair systems are engaged and defenses are mounted, the molecular details of which scientists are still working out, but which involve signaling molecules coursing through the body to rally the cellular troops, even the enlisting of the genome itself, which begins churning out defense-related proteins ... If you think about it, though, why would we expect any organism to lie down and die for our dinner? Organisms have evolved to do everything in their power to avoid being extinguished. How long would any lineage be likely to last if its members effectively didn't care if you killed them?

Supporters of ethical vegetarianism argue that support for plant rights obligates abstaining from meat, due to the use of plants to rear animals. For example, the feed conversion ratio for beef can require 4.5–7.5 kg of plant food to be used to produce 1 kg of beef. PETA states that "Whether it can be proved that plants experience pain or not, vegan foods are the compassionate choice because they require the deaths of fewer plants and animals." Singer observed that the ethical argument for vegetarianism may not apply to all non-vegetarian food. For example, any arguments against causing pain to animals would not apply to animals that do not feel pain. It has also often been noted that, while it takes a lot more grain to feed some animals such as cows for human consumption than it takes to feed a human directly, not all animals consume land plants (or other animals that consume land plants). For example, oysters consume underwater plankton and algae. In 2010, Christopher Cox wrote:

Biologically, oysters are not in the plant kingdom, but when it comes to ethical eating, they are almost indistinguishable from plants. Oyster farms account for 95 percent of all oyster consumption and have a minimal negative impact on their ecosystems; there are even nonprofit projects devoted to cultivating oysters as a way to improve water quality. Since so many oysters are farmed, there's little danger of overfishing. No forests are cleared for oysters, no fertilizer is needed, and no grain goes to waste to feed them—they have a diet of plankton, which is about as close to the bottom of the food chain as you can get. Oyster cultivation also avoids many of the negative side effects of plant agriculture: There are no bees needed to pollinate oysters, no pesticides required to kill off other insects, and for the most part, oyster farms operate without the collateral damage of accidentally killing other animals during harvesting.

Cox went on to suggest that oysters would be acceptable to eat, even by strict ethical criteria, if they did not feel, saying that "while you could give them the benefit of the doubt, you could also say that unless some new evidence of a capacity for pain emerges, the doubt is so slight that there is no good reason for avoiding eating sustainably produced oysters." Cox added that, although he believes in some of the ethical reasons for vegetarianism, he is not strictly a vegan or even a vegetarian because he consumes oysters.

=== Influences on views of animal consciousness ===
When people choose to do things about which they are ambivalent and which they would have difficulty justifying, they experience a state of cognitive dissonance, which can lead to rationalization, denial, or even self-deception. For example, a 2011 experiment found that, when the harm that their meat-eating causes animals is explicitly brought to people's attention, they tend to rate those animals as possessing fewer mental capacities compared to when the harm is not brought to their attention. This is especially evident when people expect to eat meat in the near future. Such denial makes it less uncomfortable for people to eat animals. The data suggest that people who consume meat go to great lengths to try to resolve these moral inconsistencies between their beliefs and behaviour by adjusting their beliefs about what animals are capable of feeling.

This perception can lead to paradoxical conclusions about the ethics and comfort involved in preferring certain types of meat over others. For example, venison or meat from a wild deer generally has a much higher nutritional quality and a much lower carbon footprint than meat from domestically-raised animals. In addition, it can be virtually assured that the deer was never bred or raised in unnatural conditions, confined to a cage, fed an unnatural diet of grain, or injected with any artificial hormones; however, since the necessary act of killing a deer to procure the venison is generally much more apparent to anyone who encounters this sort of meat, some people can be even more uncomfortable with eating this than meat from animals raised on factory farms. Many ethical vegetarians and ethical meat-eaters argue that it is behaviour rather than supporting beliefs that should be adjusted.

== Environmental argument ==
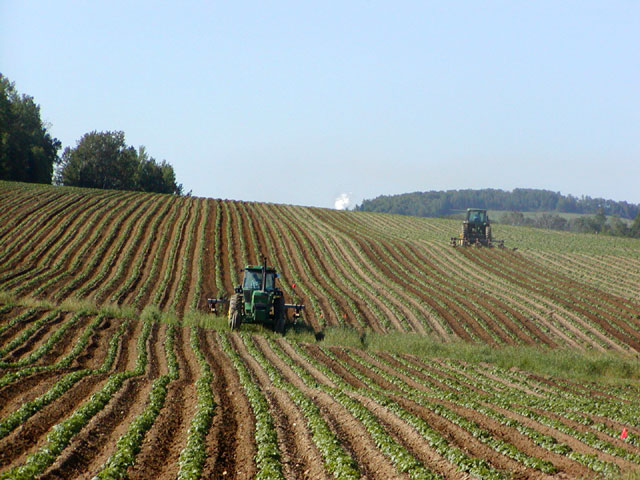
A monocultivated potato field

Some people choose to not eat meat for environmental reasons. According to a 2006 report by LEAD Livestock's Long Shadow, "the livestock sector emerges as one of the top two or three most significant contributors to the most serious environmental problems, at every scale from local to global." The livestock sector is probably the largest source of water pollution (due to animal wastes, fertilizers, and pesticides), contributing to eutrophication, human health problems, and the emergence of antibiotic resistance. It accounts also for over 8% of global human water use. Livestock production is the biggest human use of land, and it accounts for around 25% of the global land surface, or two-thirds of all agricultural land. It is probably the leading player in biodiversity loss, as it causes deforestation, land degradation, pollution, climate change, and overfishing.

A 2017 study by the World Wildlife Fund found that 60% of biodiversity loss can be attributed to the vast scale of feed crop cultivation needed to rear tens of billions of farm animals. Livestock is also responsible for at least 20% of the world's greenhouse gas emissions, which are the main cause of the current climate change. This is due to feed production, enteric fermentation from ruminants, manure storage and processing, and transportation of animal products. The greenhouse gas emissions from livestock production greatly exceeds the greenhouse gas emissions of any other human activity. Some authors argue that by far the best thing we can do to slow climate change is a global shift towards a vegetarian or vegan diet. A 2017 study published in the journal Carbon Balance and Management found animal agriculture's global methane emissions are 11% higher than previously estimated. In November 2017, 15,364 world scientists signed a warning to humanity calling for, among other things, "promoting dietary shifts towards mostly plant-based foods." A 2019 report in The Lancet recommended that global meat consumption be reduced by 50 percent to mitigate climate change.

Many developing countries, including China and India, are moving away from traditional plant-based diets to more meat-intensive diets as the result of modernization and globalization, which has facilitated the spread of Western consumer cultures around the world. Around 166 to over 200 billion land and aquatic animals are consumed by the global population of over 8 billion every year, and meat consumption is projected to more than double by 2050 as the population grows to over 9 billion. A 2018 study published in Science states that meat consumption could rise by as much as 76% by 2050 as the result of human population growth and rising affluence, which will increase greenhouse gas emissions and further reduce biodiversity. David Attenborough warned in 2020 that "the planet can't support billions of meat-eaters."

Animals that feed on grain or rely on grazing require more water than grain crops. Producing 1 kg (2.2 lb) of meat requires up to 15,000 liters of water. According to the United States Department of Agriculture (USDA), growing crops for farm animals requires nearly half of the US water supply and 80% of its agricultural land. Animals raised for food in the US consume 90% of the soy crop, 80% of the corn crop, and 70% of its grain. However, where an extensive farming system (as opposed to a feedlot) is used, some water and nutrients are returned to the soil to provide a benefit to the pasture. This cycling and processing of water and nutrients is less prevalent in most plant production systems, so may bring the efficiency rate of animal production closer to the efficiency of plant based agricultural systems. In tracking food animal production from the feed through to the dinner table, the inefficiencies of meat, milk, and egg production range from a 4:1 energy input to protein output ratio up to 54:1. The result is that producing animal-based food is typically much less efficient than the harvesting of grains, vegetables, legumes, seeds, and fruits.

There are also environmentalist arguments in favor of the morality of eating meat. One such line of argument holds that sentience and individual welfare are less important to morality than the greater ecological good. Following environmentalist Aldo Leopold's principle that the sole criterion for morality is preserving the "integrity, stability and beauty of the biotic community", this position asserts that sustainable hunting and animal agriculture are environmentally healthy and therefore good. Jay Bost, an agroecologist and winner of The New York Times' essay contest on the ethics of eating meat, supports meat consumption, arguing that "eating meat raised in specific circumstances is ethical; eating meat raised in other circumstances is unethical" in regard to environmental usage. He proposes that if "ethical is defined as living in the most ecologically benign way, then in fairly specific circumstances, of which each eater must educate himself, eating meat is ethical." The specific circumstances he mentions include using animals to cycle nutrients and convert sun to food.

== Religious traditions ==
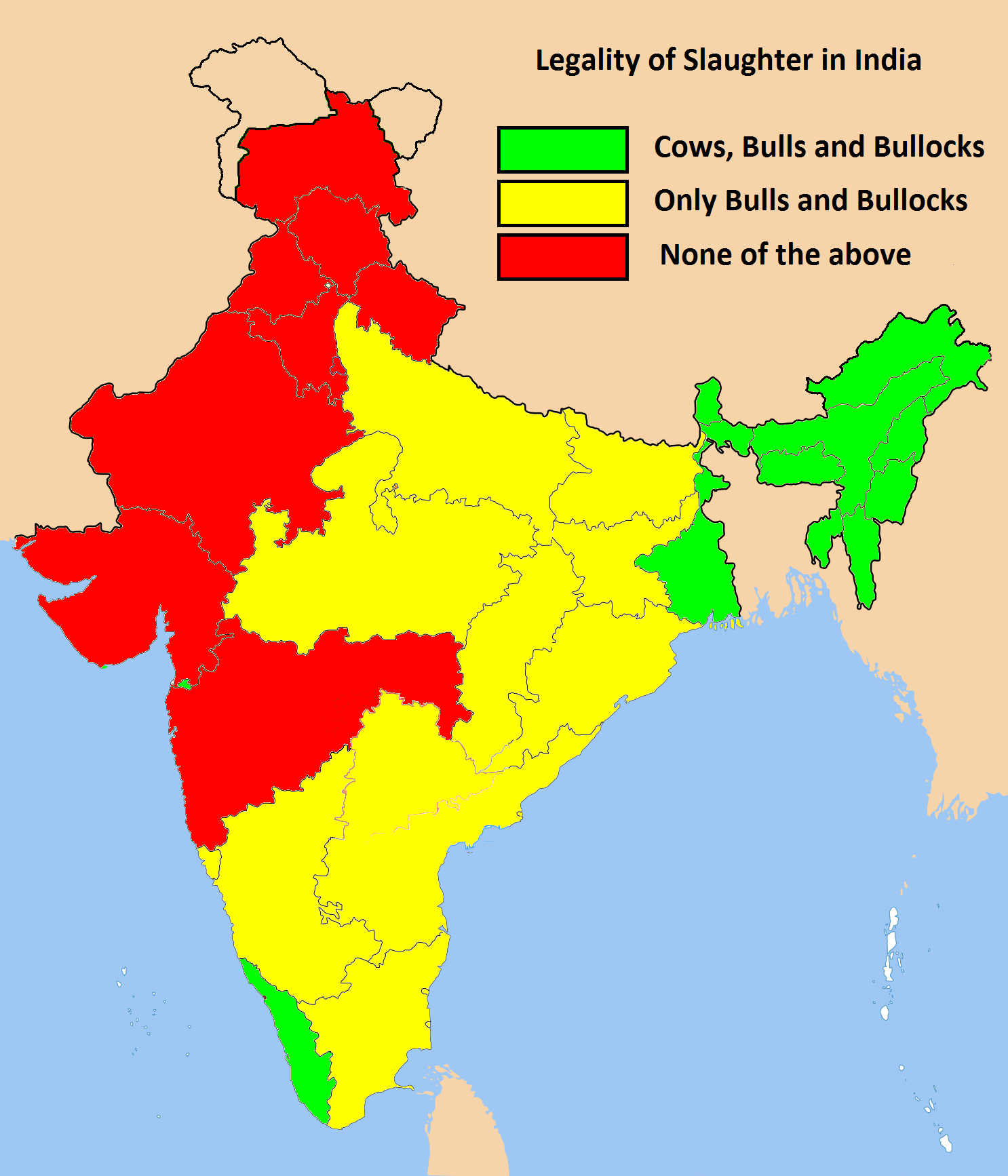
Cow slaughter laws in various states of India

Hinduism holds vegetarianism as an ideal for three reasons: the principle of nonviolence (ahimsa) applied to animals; the intention to offer only "pure" (vegetarian) or sattvic food to a deity and then to receive it back as prasad; and the conviction that an insentient diet is beneficial for a healthy body and mind and that non-vegetarian food is detrimental for the mind and for spiritual development. Buddhist vegetarianism has similar strictures against hurting animals. The actual practices of Hindus and Buddhists vary according to their community and according to regional traditions. Jains are especially rigorous about not harming sentient organisms.

Islamic Law and Judaism have dietary guidelines called Halal and Kashrut, respectively. In Judaism, meat that may be consumed according to halakha (Jewish law) is termed kosher; meat that is not compliant with Jewish law is called treif. Causing unnecessary pain to animals is prohibited by the principle of tza'ar ba'alei chayim. While it is neither required nor prohibited for Jews to eat meat, a number of medieval scholars of Judaism, such as Joseph Albo and Isaac Arama, regard vegetarianism as a moral ideal. Similarly, Islamic dietary laws permit the consumption of certain animals at the condition that their meat is not obtained through prohibited methods of slaughtering (ex: strangling, beaten to death, etc.), along with adherence to other restrictions. Meat obtained through prohibited methods of slaughtering is considered haram.

In Christianity as practised by members of Eastern Orthodox Church, Roman Catholic Church, Greek Catholic Church, and others, it is prohibited to eat meat in times of fasting. Rules of fasting also vary. There are also Christian monastic orders that practice vegetarianism.

Shinto has a concept of kegare, which means a state of pollution and defilement, and traditionally eating animals is thought to be one of them. Eating animals having more legs is thought to be worse (i.e., eating mammals is worse than eating chickens or fish). This concept leads to discrimination against slaughtermen and people who work with leather, who are called burakumin. Shinran, the founder of the Buddhist sect Jōdo Shinshū, taught that lower class who had to kill beings could enter nirvana even though killing animals was thought to be immoral.

== Personhood ==
It has been argued by a number of modern philosophers that a moral community requires all participants to be able to make moral decisions, but animals are incapable of making moral choices (e.g., a tiger would not refrain from eating a human because it was morally wrong; it would decide whether to attack based on its survival needs, as dictated by hunger). Thus, some opponents of ethical vegetarianism argue that the analogy between killing animals and killing people is misleading. For example, Hsiao (2015) compares the moral severity of harming animals to that of picking a flower or introducing malware into a computer. Others have argued that humans are capable of culture, innovation, and the sublimation of instinct in order to act in an ethical manner while animals are not, and so are unequal to humans on a moral level. This does not excuse cruelty, but it implies animals are not morally equivalent to humans and do not possess the rights a human has. The precise definition of a moral community is not simple, but Hsiao defines membership by the ability to know one's own good and that of other members, and to be able to grasp this in the abstract. He claims that non-human animals do not meet this standard.

However, philosopher Peter Singer insists that the capacity for suffering, rather than the ability to have more reasoning, is the main basis for more consideration, and since many animals experience their own pain and pleasure their interests shall not be ignored just because they are not rational agents.

Benjamin Franklin describes his conversion to vegetarianism in chapter one of his autobiography but he describes why he periodically ceased vegetarianism in his later life. He wrote:

...in my first voyage from Boston...our people set about catching cod, and hauled up a great many. Hitherto I had stuck to my resolution of not eating animal food... But I had formerly been a great lover of fish, and, when this came hot out of the frying-pan, it smelt admirably well. I balanc'd some time between principle and inclination, till I recollected that, when the fish were opened, I saw smaller fish taken out of their stomachs; then thought I, "If you eat one another, I don't see why we mayn't eat you." So I din'd upon cod very heartily, and continued to eat with other people, returning only now and then occasionally to a vegetable diet. So convenient a thing it is to be a reasonable creature, since it enables one to find or make a reason for everything one has a mind to do.

== Zoonotic diseases and antibiotic resistance ==
Opponents of eating meat argue that meat production foments zoonotic diseases, leading to increased pandemics, a claim backed up by a 2020 United Nations report. A 2017 paper stated that "An estimated 60% of known infectious diseases and up to 75% of new or emerging infectious diseases are zoonotic in origin" and that "It is estimated that zoonoses are responsible for 2.5 billion cases of human illness and 2.7 million human deaths worldwide each year". Meat production often involves the usage of antibiotics on livestock, fueling antibiotic resistance. Antibiotic resistance has been argued to be as big of a threat as climate change. Critics of this line of reasoning state that while widespread adoption of vegan diets would reduce the fomenting of zoonotic diseases, antibiotic resistance, and pandemics, vegan food production still often involves antibiotics and does not eliminate these problems altogether.

== Animals killed in crop harvesting ==
Steven L. Davis, a professor of animal science at Oregon State University, argues that the least harm principle does not require giving up all meat. Davis states that a diet containing beef from grass-fed ruminants such as cattle would kill fewer animals than a vegetarian diet, particularly when one takes into account animals killed by agriculture. This conclusion has been criticized by Jason Gaverick Matheny (founder of in vitro meat organization New Harvest) because it calculates the number of animals killed per acre (instead of per consumer). Matheny says that, when the numbers are adjusted, Davis' argument shows veganism as perpetrating the least harm. Davis' argument has also been criticized by Andy Lamey for being based on only two studies that may not represent commercial agricultural practices. When differentiating between animals killed by farm machinery and those killed by other animals, he says that the studies again show veganism to do the "least harm". Christopher Bobier maintains that arguments against the consumption of factory-farmed meat can also apply to vegetables produced under factory conditions due to animals killed in the production process (arguing that alternative sources of vegetables mean factory-produced vegetables are not necessary) and thus does not represent a prima facie argument for vegetarianism.

== Non-meat products ==
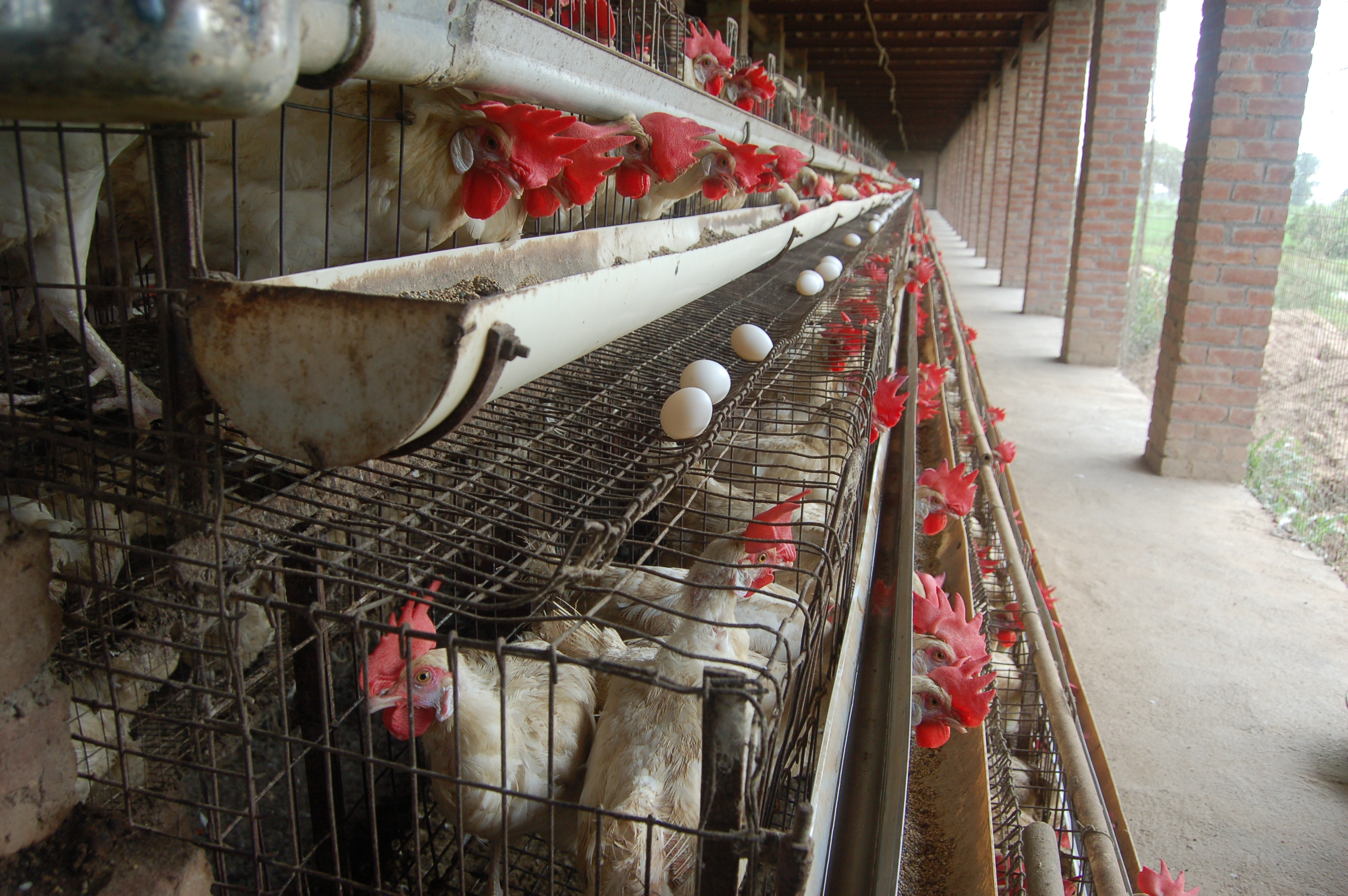
Egg-laying chickens in battery cages

One of the main differences between a vegan and a typical vegetarian diet is the avoidance of eggs, honey and dairy products such as milk, cheese, butter, and yogurt. Ethical vegans do not consume dairy or eggs because of the exploitation and slaughter of animals in the dairy and egg industries and because of the environmental effect of dairy production.

To produce milk from dairy cattle, most calves are separated from their mothers soon after birth (called cow-calf separation) and fed milk replacement in order to retain the cows' milk for human consumption. Animal welfare advocates point out that this breaks the natural bond between the mother and her calf. Unwanted male calves are either slaughtered at birth or sent for veal production. To prolong lactation, dairy cows are almost permanently kept pregnant through artificial insemination. Although cows' natural life expectancy is about twenty years, after about five years the cows' milk production has dropped; they are then considered "spent" and are sent to slaughter for meat and leather.

Battery cages are the predominant form of housing for egg laying hens worldwide; these cages reduce aggression and cannibalism among hens, but are barren, restrict movement, and increase rates of osteoporosis. In these systems and in free-range egg production, unwanted male chicks are culled and killed at birth during the process of securing a further generation of egg-laying hens. It is estimated that an average consumer of eggs who eats 200 eggs per year for 70 years of his or her life is responsible for the deaths of 140 birds, and that an average consumer of milk who drinks 190 kg (420 lb) per year for 70 years is responsible for the deaths of 2.5 cows.

== Cultured meat ==
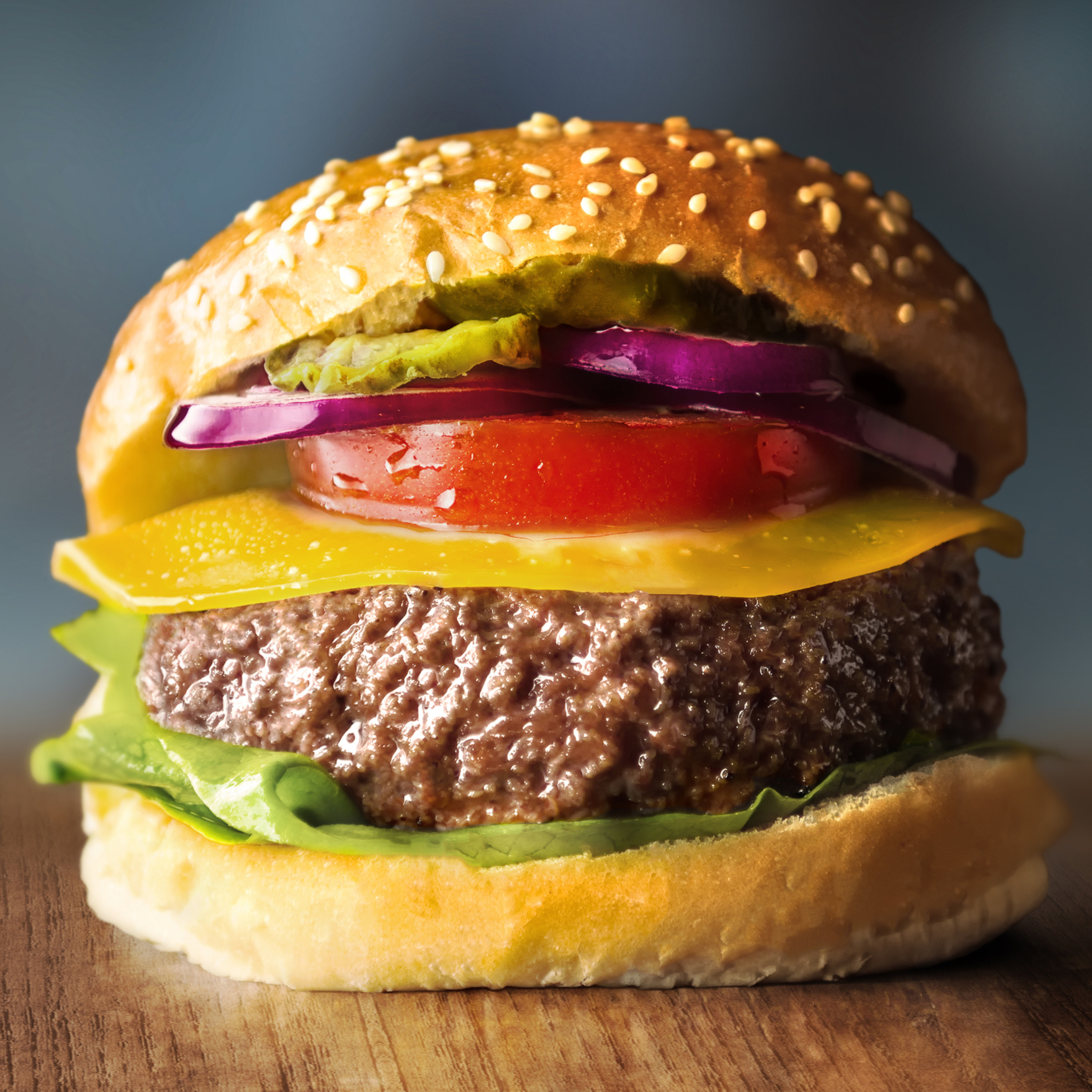
The first cell-cultured hamburger, cooked at a news conference in London, 2013

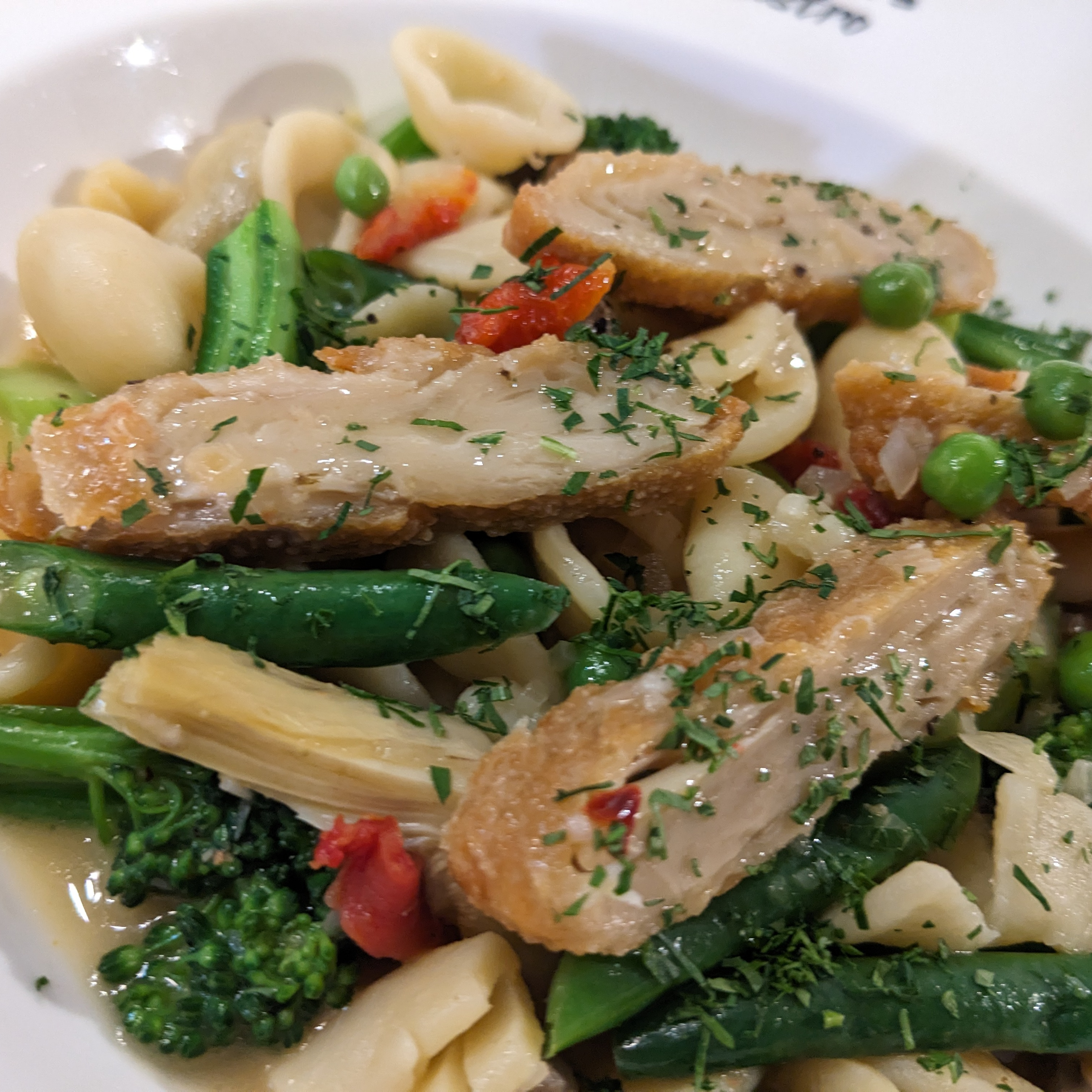
Cultured chicken in pasta salad, served at a restaurant in Singapore, 2023

Cultured meat, also known as cultivated meat among other names, is a form of cellular agriculture wherein meat is produced by culturing animal cells in vitro. This production method involves the molecularly identical growth of animal flesh, outside of a living animal. Cultured meat is produced using tissue engineering techniques pioneered in regenerative medicine. It is known for its potential to mitigate the environmental impact of meat production, as well as to address issues related to animal welfare, food security, and human health. Its potential has long been of interest, including to British statesman Winston Churchill in 1931.

Most efforts focus on common meats such as pork, beef, and chicken; species which constitute the bulk of conventional meat consumption in developed countries. Some companies have pursued various species of fish and other seafood, such as Avant Meats who brought cultured grouper to market in 2021. Other companies such as Orbillion Bio have focused on high-end or unusual meats including elk, lamb, bison, and Wagyu beef.

The production process of cultured meat is constantly evolving, driven by companies and research institutions. The applications for cultured meat have led to ethical, health, environmental, cultural, and economic discussions. Data published by The Good Food Institute found that in 2021 through 2023, cultured meat and seafood companies attracted over $2.5 billion in investment worldwide. However, cultured meat is not yet widely available.

== See also ==
- Ahimsa – Ancient Indian principle of nonviolence
- Animal–industrial complex – Systematic, institutionalized exploitation of animals
- Devour the Earth – British journalist and writer
- Economic vegetarianism – Dietary perspective
- Ethical omnivorism – Omnivorism that is selective of sourcing
- Ethics of uncertain sentience – Area of applied ethics
- Five precepts – Basic code of ethics for Buddhist laity
- Hard problem of consciousness – Philosophical problem about why neural processes give rise to inner experience at all
- Moral agency – Ability to make ethical judgements
- Non-aggression principle – Core concept in libertarianism
- Psychology of eating meat – Psychology of human consumption of meat
- Problem of other minds – Epistemological problem
- Replaceability argument – Philosophical argument against vegetarianism
- Sustainable diet – Diet that contributes to the broader environmental and social sustainability
