= André Nakhavali =

André (Mahdi) Nakhavali
- مهدی نخاولی
- André Nakhavali
- Education: University of Exeter (PhD, 2019)
- Known for: Terrestrial carbon cycle modelling; machine learning applications in environmental science; forest ecosystem modelling
- Relatives: Miad Nakhavali (brother)
- Awards: Kamide Lecture Award in Biogeosciences (2027); Springer Nature Editor of Distinction Award (2026)
- Scientific career
- Fields: Environmental science, Climate change, Carbon cycle, Forest ecology, Machine learning
- Workplaces: International Institute for Applied Systems Analysis (IIASA)
- Website: iiasa.ac.at/staff/andre-nakhavali

André (Mahdi) Nakhavali is a British-Persian environmental scientist and researcher at the International Institute for Applied Systems Analysis (IIASA) in Austria. His research focuses on forest ecosystems, terrestrial carbon cycling, climate change mitigation and adaptation, and computational ecosystem modelling.

== Education and career ==
Nakhavali's early research contributions are documented in the European Commission's CORDIS reporting for the Horizon 2020 C-LEAK project, which describes his involvement in developing dissolved organic carbon cycling and transport processes in the Joint UK Land Environment Simulator (JULES) during his doctoral research at Exeter.

At IIASA, Nakhavali has contributed to the European Union-funded ForestNavigator project, which investigates sustainable forest management pathways and the role of European forests in climate change mitigation. The European Commission featured the project through its European Climate, Infrastructure and Environment Executive Agency (CINEA), highlighting its contribution to modelling forest pathways towards climate neutrality.

== Awards and recognition ==
In 2026, Nakhavali was selected for the 2027 Kamide Lecture Award in Biogeosciences by the Asia Oceania Geosciences Society (AOGS). He is scheduled to deliver an invited lecture at the society's 2027 annual meeting.

In the same year, he received Springer Nature's Editor of Distinction Award in the Editorial Contribution category for his work with Carbon Balance and Management.

On 28 October 2026, Radio Farda published a Persian-language feature by journalist Mehran Karimi about Nakhavali's transition from electronic music to scientific research and his selection for the Kamide Lecture Award.

== Early life ==
Before entering scientific research, Nakhavali was involved in electronic music production alongside his brothers, Miad and Taha. He later pursued academic studies in mathematics and environmental science.

He resides in Vienna, Austria, with his wife, Seren.
