= Why We Love Dogs, Eat Pigs, and Wear Cows =

2009 book by Melanie Joy

- Author: Melanie Joy
- Subject: Food and drink
- Publisher: Conari Press
- Publication date: 2009
- Publication place: United States
- Media type: Print (hardback and paperback) and audiobook
- Pages: 204 pp.
- ISBN: 1-573-24461-9
- OCLC: 316832932
- Dewey Decimal: 641.36
- LC Class: TX371.J69 2010

Why We Love Dogs, Eat Pigs, and Wear Cows: An Introduction to Carnism is a 2009 book by American social psychologist Melanie Joy about the belief system and psychology of meat eating, or "carnism". Joy coined the term carnism in 2001 and developed it in her doctoral dissertation in 2003. Carnism is a subset of speciesism, and contrasts with ethical veganism, the moral commitment to abstain from consuming or using meat and other animal products. In 2020, an anniversary edition of the book was published by Red Wheel.

== Background ==
Joy, a social psychologist and author, was concerned about linguistic bias inherent in terms like carnivore, which were inaccurate and failed to account for the "beliefs beneath the behavior". Carnivores require meat in their diet for survival whereas carnists choose to eat meat based on their beliefs. Joy discovered that there was no label for the beliefs of people who produce, consume, and promote meat eating. She created the term carnism (Latin carn, flesh or body) to name and describe this dominant cultural belief system. Joy writes: "We assume that it is not necessary to assign a term to ourselves when we adhere to the mainstream way of thinking, as though its prevalence makes it an intrinsic part of life rather than a widely held opinion. Meat eating, though culturally dominant, reflects a choice that is not espoused by everybody."

== Synopsis ==
Carnism, according to Joy, is the dominant, yet invisible paradigm in modern culture supporting the choice to consume meat. Carnism is an invisible system of beliefs in both the social, psychological, and physical sense. For example, in the physical sense, an estimated 10 billion land animals are slaughtered for their meat every year in the United States, yet most of the animals are never seen—they are kept in confined animal feeding operations, invisible to the public and off limits to the media. Joy maintains that the choice to eat meat is not natural or a given as proponents of meat claim but is influenced by social conditioning. The majority of people, Joy claims, care deeply about animals and do not want them to suffer.

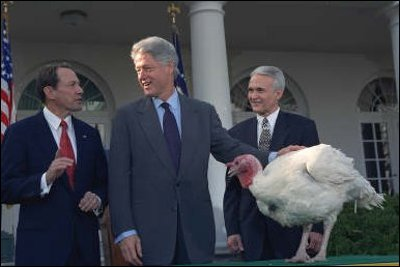
President Bill Clinton at the National Thanksgiving Turkey Presentation. Clinton presented a "discursive challenge to carnism" when he publicly recognized that turkeys were independent and had different personalities.

Joy argues there is a neurological basis for empathy; most people care about nonhuman animals and want to prevent their suffering. While humans value compassion, reciprocity, and justice, human behavior does not match these values. To continue to eat animals, Joy argues that people engage in psychic numbing, which alters the perception of our behavior towards animals and uses defense mechanisms to block empathy. First, carnism denies there is a problem with eating animals; second, it justifies eating meat as normal, natural, and necessary; and third, to prevent cognitive dissonance, carnism alters the perception of the animals as living individuals into food objects, abstractions, and categories. People who hold to these beliefs may also be called carnists.

Joy argues that through this denial, justification, and perceptual distortion, carnism influences people to violate their core values. Animal advocates and cultural studies scholars have implicated both the government and the media as the two primary channels responsible for legitimizing carnist discourse in the United States.

== Critical reception ==
Writer Megan Kearns agrees with Joy's argument that the system of carnism is at odds with democracy; however, she takes issue with Joy blaming the system rather than the people who make carnist choices, and says: "[The] way we as a society envision eating and animals is contradictory and insidious. Yet it seems incongruous to blame the system and simultaneously hold people accountable to awaken their consciences and exercise their free will." Kearns also observes that not only are there many empathic people who choose to eat meat but that many vegetarians base their diet on health, not moral reasons.

Helena Pedersen of Malmö University questions whether it is accurate for Joy to treat meat eaters as a homogenous group as there may be many different types of meat eaters all of whom have different reasons for eating meat. Proponents of the abolitionist theory of animal rights, such as Gary L. Francione, do not accept the concept of carnism as they believe it indirectly supports the animal welfare position by neglecting to call for the immediate rejection of all animal use and for not explicitly promoting veganism.

== Influence ==
Journalist Avery Yale Kamila reviewed Joy's book in 2020 and said it has "played a pivotal role" in changing "how humans think about animals". Kamila wrote:

In December, Vox put Why We Love Dogs at the top of its list of "19 books from the 2010s we can't stop thinking about." In January, Joy talked with The Washington Post about "Why that vegan meal at the Golden Globes set off so many critics." And this summer one of three winning essays (out of 1,242 submissions) in The New York Times' annual Student Editorial Contest was headlined "Bringing Ethics to Your Plate" and cited the book in its second paragraph.

== Editions ==
The book has been translated into several languages, including Hebrew, Hungarian, Italian, Korean, French, Traditional Chinese, Swedish, Danish, Croatian, Spanish, German, Portuguese, and Dutch. A 10th anniversary edition was released in 2020, with a new foreword by Yuval Noah Harari.

== See also ==
- Ethics of eating meat
- List of vegan and plant-based media

== Bibliography ==
- Pilisuk, Marc, Joy, M. (2001). Humanistic Psychology and Ecology. In Kirk J. Schneider, James F. T. Bugental and J. Fraser Pierson (Ed.), The Handbook of Humanistic Psychology: Leading Edges in Theory, Research, and Practice (pp. 101–114). Sage Publications. ISBN 0761927824.
- Joy, M. (March 2003). Toward a Non-Speciesist Psychoethic. Society & Animals 11(1), 103–104. doi:10.1163/156853003321618882
- Joy, M. (Winter 2005). Humanistic Psychology and Animal Rights: Reconsidering the Boundaries of the Humanistic Ethic. Journal of Humanistic Psychology 45(1), 106–130. doi:10.1177/0022167804272628
- Joy, M. (January 21, 2013). Speaking Truth to Power: Understanding the Dominant, Animal-Eating Narrative for Vegan Empowerment and Social Transformation. One Green Planet.
- Joy, M. (February 26, 2013). Why Horsemeat Is Delicious and Disgusting. Huffington Post.

== Author interviews ==
- Runkle, Nathan (September 3, 2010). "The Mentality of Meat: An Exclusive Interview with Dr. Melanie Joy". Mercy for Animals. Archived from the original on November 18, 2013. "I wrote Why We Love Dogs... for both carnists and veg*ns."
- "Dr. Melanie Joy Interview". Animal Rights Zone. April 24, 2010. Archived from the original on October 30, 2015. "And though I don't use the phrase 'animal rights' I certainly do argue that one species' desire should not trump another species' right to live free from harm."
- Stafford, Jessi (February 24, 2012). "Feature Interview: Melanie Joy on Books, Documentaries, and Carnism". La Jolla, California: Vegan Mainstream. Archived from the original on November 4, 2013. "Later I turned my dissertation into a book for a lay audience."
