= Andy Lamey =

Canadian philosopher

- Occupation: Academic philosopher

Education
- Education: University of King's College; University of Ottawa; University of Western Australia
- Thesis: The Ethical Creature: Animals and Equal Consideration (2011)
- Doctoral advisors: Miri Albahari; Keith Horton
- Other advisor: Will Kymlicka

Philosophical work
- Institutions: University of California, San Diego
- Notable ideas: New omnivorism

Andy Lamey is a Canadian philosopher and former journalist. He is a teaching professor at the University of California, San Diego (UC San Diego). He is the author of Frontier Justice: The Global Refugee Crisis and What To Do About It (Doubleday Canada/University of Queensland Press, 2011) Duty and the Beast: Should We Eat Meat in the Name of Animal Rights? (Cambridge University Press, 2019) and The Canadian Mind: Essays on Writers and Thinkers (Sutherland House, 2023).

== Academic career ==
Lamey read for a BA (Hons) in philosophy at the University of King's College, graduating in 1993. He qualified with an MA in philosophy from the University of Ottawa in 1998, having written a thesis entitled Rebuilding Berlin's Bridge: Value Pluralism as a Support to Liberalism on Isaiah Berlin under the supervision of Will Kymlicka. Lamey was awarded a PhD in philosophy in 2011 from the University of Western Australia. His thesis was entitled The Ethical Creature: Animals and Equal Consideration, and was supervised by Keith Horton and then Miri Albahari.

Lamey held short-term teaching positions at Australian universities from 2008 to 2013, working variously at Notre Dame, the University of Western Australia, and Monash University. In 2011, he published his first book, Frontier Justice: The Global Refugee Crisis and What To Do About It. The book explores the conflict between state sovereignty and the human rights of refugees through a range of case studies. Lamey's ultimate proposal is to allow lawmakers to relocate those seeking asylum to third countries that are sufficiently rights-respecting, while affording all asylum seekers the right to a timely and full hearing, the right to legal counsel, and a right against arbitrary detention.

Lamey took up the post of an assistant teaching professor at UC San Diego in 2013. He was promoted to associate teaching professor in 2019, and, in the same year, published Duty and the Beast: Should We Eat Meat in the Name of Animal Rights? In this book, Lamey explores the ethics of "new omnivorism", which is a position arguing that even if animals have high moral standing, meat eating is permissible (or obligatory). For example, Steven L. Davis argues that animal deaths in plant agriculture mean that advocates of animal rights should favour a diet containing some kinds of beef, rather than a vegan or vegetarian diet. Lamey challenges this position, which he calls "burger veganism". He also rejects arguments from plant neurobiology supposedly grounding obligations to plants, as well as the logic of the larder, which claims that animals lose out if they are not brought into existence to be eaten. Though Lamey generally concludes that the new omnivore positions should be rejected, he allows that the consumption of in vitro meat and plant-based meat is permissible.

In 2023, Lamey was promoted to (full) teaching professor. His book The Canadian Mind: Essays on Writers and Thinkers was published the same year by Sutherland House Books. It features essays on Margaret Atwood, Conrad Black, Joseph Boyden, David Frum, Mavis Gallant, Stephen Henighan, Will Kymlicka, Dany Laferrière, John Metcalf, and Charles Taylor.

== Journalism ==
Lamey has worked as a journalist, publishing work in a variety of places, including the Literary Review of Canada, to which he has regularly contributed since 2010, The New Republic, The Times Literary Supplement, The National Post, Maclean’s, and The Walrus. He has also produced radio documentaries for the CBC series Ideas.

Lamey won a Gold award at the 2002 Canadian National Magazine Awards in the one-of-a-kind magazine journalism category. A journalistic essay of Lamey's on Donald Trump was published in Biblioasis's 2019 volume of Best Canadian Essays, and one about free speech on university campuses was included in the 2020 volume.

== Selected publications ==
=== Books ===
- Lamey, Andy (2023). The Canadian Mind. Toronto: Sutherland House.
- Lamey, Andy (2019). Duty and the Beast. Cambridge: Cambridge University Press.
- Lamey, Andy (2011). Frontier Justice. Toronto: Doubleday Canada. Brisbane: University of Queensland Press.

=== Papers ===
- Fischer, Bob, and Andy Lamey (2018). "Field Deaths in Plant Agriculture". Journal of Agricultural and Environmental Ethics 31 (4): 409–28. doi:10.1007/s10806-018-9733-8.
- Lamey, Andy, and Ike Sharpless (2018). "Making the Animals on the Plate Visible: Anglophone Celebrity Chef Cookbooks Ranked by Sentient Animal Deaths". Food Ethics 2 (1): 409–28. doi:10.1007/s41055-018-0024-x.
- Lamey, Andy (2007). "Food Fight! Davis vs. Regan on the Ethics of Eating Beef". Journal of Social Philosophy 38 (2): 331–48. doi:10.1111/j.1467-9833.2007.00382.x.
