= Melanie Joy =

American psychologist (born 1966)

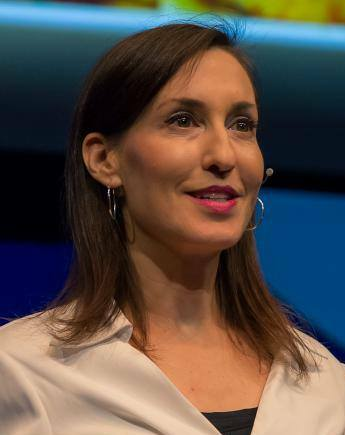
- Joy in 2015
- Born: September 2, 1966 (age 60)
- Education: Harvard University (M.Ed.); Saybrook University (Ph.D.)
- Occupations: Social psychologist; non-fiction author; president of Beyond Carnism
- Website: melaniejoy.org

Melanie Joy (born September 2, 1966) is an American social psychologist and author, primarily notable for coining the term carnism. She is the founding president of nonprofit advocacy group Beyond Carnism, previously known as Carnism Awareness & Action Network (CAAN), as well as a former professor of psychology and sociology at the University of Massachusetts Boston. She has published the books Strategic Action for Animals, Why We Love Dogs, Eat Pigs, and Wear Cows and Beyond Beliefs.

== Background ==
Joy received her M.Ed. from the Harvard Graduate School of Education, and her Ph.D. in psychology from the Saybrook Graduate School. At age 23, while a student at Harvard, she contracted a food-borne disease from a tainted hamburger and was hospitalized, which led her to become a vegetarian. In a speech related by Indian cabinet minister Maneka Gandhi, Joy recalled how her dietary choice, made for non-moral reasons, transformed her perspective on the treatment of animals:

That experience led me to swear off meat, which led me to become more open to information about animal agriculture—information that had been all around me but that I had been unwilling to see, so long as I was still invested in maintaining my current way of life. And as I learned the truth about meat, egg and dairy production, I became increasingly distraught. ... I wound up confused and despairing. I felt like a rudderless boat, lost on a sea of collective insanity. Nothing had changed, but everything was different.

Joy later made a gradual transition to veganism. In a 2013 interview, she said that her doctoral research had initially focused on the psychosociology of violence and discrimination, but later shifted to questions about the psychology of eating meat. Perceiving a pattern of irrational and inconsistent thinking among the subjects she interviewed, she was led to theorize that attitudes about meat reflected acquired prejudice. This idea became the basis for much of her later work.

== Theory of carnism ==
Joy introduced the term carnism in a 2001 article published in Satya, initially receiving little attention. The concept was revisited by her 2009 book Why We Love Dogs, Eat Pigs, and Wear Cows. Her ideas influenced subsequent studies of what has come to be known as the meat paradox—the apparent inconsistency in common attitudes toward animals, wherein people may express affection towards some animals while eating others—and the cognitive dissonance it entails. A number of psychologists are supportive of Joy's beliefs concerning the influence of eating meat on attitudes toward animals.

== Activism ==
Joy founded Carnism Awareness & Action Network (CAAN), later renamed Beyond Carnism, in 2010. According to a review by Animal Charity Evaluators, the organization uses public talks, media campaigns, video development, and activist training in an effort to shift the public conversation about meat mainly in the United States and Germany. The review judged CAAN's novel organizational strategies to be promising in terms of their potential to foster a sustained network of animal rights advocates, but noted that the relatively new group lacked a track record, and that the effects of its approach would be difficult to assess.

== Other appearances ==
In 2022, Joy co-hosted a podcast called Just Beings with actress Evanna Lynch.

In 2024, Joy appeared in the British documentary film I Could Never Go Vegan.

== Awards ==
In 2013, Joy won the Ahimsa Award for her work on global nonviolence. In her acceptance speech, she said, "Transforming carnism is not simply about changing behavior, but about shifting consciousness. It is about shifting from ignorance to awareness, from apathy to empathy, from callousness to compassion, from denial to truth – and from violence, to ahimsa."

== See also ==
- List of animal rights advocates
- Animal–industrial complex
- Speciesism
- Effective altruism
- Ed Winters
- Peter Singer

== Bibliography ==
- Strategic Action for Animals: A Handbook on Strategic Movement Building, Organizing, and Activism for Animal Liberation (2008). ISBN 978-1590561362.
- Why We Love Dogs, Eat Pigs, and Wear Cows: An Introduction to Carnism (2009). ISBN 978-1573244619.
- Beyond Beliefs: A Guide to Improving Relationships and Communication for Vegans, Vegetarians, and Meat Eaters (2018). ISBN 978-1590565803.
- Powerarchy: Understanding the Psychology of Oppression for Social Transformation (2019). ISBN 978-1523086665.
- Getting Relationships Right: How to Build Resilience and Thrive in Life, Love, and Work (2020). ISBN 978-1523088508.
