= Miad Nakhavali =

Iranian political analyst

- Education: University of Belgrade (PhD)
- Occupation: Political analyst
- Known for: Founding Middle East Analitika
- Relatives: André Nakhavali (brother)

Miad Nakhavali is an Iranian political analyst who comments on Iranian foreign policy and regional security. He founded Middle East Analitika, a podcast on Middle Eastern politics and international affairs. His research has examined Iran's rivalry with Saudi Arabia and European responses to nuclear proliferation.

== Education and research ==
Nakhavali defended his doctoral dissertation at the Faculty of Political Sciences of the University of Belgrade in 2022. His dissertation examined the rivalry between Iran and Saudi Arabia after the 1979 Iranian Revolution.

In 2025, Nakhavali took part in a European Union non-proliferation and disarmament internship programme hosted in Belgrade by the Professional Association of the Security Sector. He and Marina Kostić Šulejić co-authored The Proliferation Crisis in the Middle East – A View from Iran, which drew on work undertaken during the programme. The paper examined how historical grievances, nationalism, ideology, and domestic politics shaped Iran's nuclear policy.

In 2026, Nakhavali, Kostić Šulejić, and Mira Šorović published an article in The Review of International Affairs comparing the European Union's responses to nuclear proliferation in India, Pakistan, North Korea, and the Middle East.

== Podcast and professional engagements ==
Through Middle East Analitika, Nakhavali has interviewed researchers on regional affairs. A 2023 episode documented by Swansea University examined Morocco's domestic and foreign policy. In June 2024, he appeared on the Persian-language Politics365.com programme on KIRN in Los Angeles. In 2026, the organizers of the Belgrade Security and Intelligence Forum listed him as a speaker and identified him as the founder of Middle East Analitika.

== Media commentary ==
In a 2026 interview with N1, Nakhavali said that U.S. objectives in the war with Iran had shifted from regime change to curbing Iran's nuclear programme. In a separate N1 interview, he discussed the role of the Strait of Hormuz in negotiations and the distribution of power within Iran's leadership.

On Radio Television of Serbia's Takovska 10, he discussed Tehran's efforts to raise the costs of the conflict for its adversaries. In August 2026, he spoke to Radio Belgrade about U.S. pressure on buyers of Iranian oil.

In interviews with Euronews Serbia, Nakhavali discussed Iran's military capabilities and the prospects for ending the conflict. He addressed the conflict's economic consequences in Blic and discussed uncertainty over Iran's political leadership with Newsmax Balkans.
