= Ethical omnivorism =

Omnivorism that is selective of sourcing

Ethical omnivorism, omnivorism, or compassionate carnivorism (as opposed to obligatory carnivorism, the view that it is obligatory for people to eat animals) is a human diet involving the consumption of meat, eggs, and dairy produced according to more stringent ethical standards.

Marine fish consumption is limited to sustainably farm-raised and/or ethically and wild caught, without contributing to illegal poaching.

Ethical omnivorism could be considered similar to locavorism.

== Rationale ==
This diet tries to increase consumer support for more ethical meat production with the aim that it might be able to give incentive for more restaurants and stores to use ethical sources.

The main concerns of ethical omnivorists are related to the environmental impact of food (agricultural land use, greenhouse gases, water use and fertilizer runoff) and the welfare of farm animals. Proposed attitudes to eat more sustainably include: eating organic foods, eating local, having moderate red meat consumption, eating more plant-based proteins, and reducing food waste. As for animal welfare, there are product certifications in many countries (like in the US the Animal Humane Certified or the Certified Humane Raised & Handled) aimed at consumers with ethical concerns about the life conditions of the animals at the farms.

== Criticism ==
Because there are data showing negative environmental effects of red meat consumption, some vegetarians and vegans criticize ethical omnivorism for failing to eliminate animal products entirely, claiming that humans do not require animal products to be healthy.

Proponents of ethical omnivorism may themselves concede that "vegetarian and vegan diets tend to be more environmentally friendly", while still seeing ethical omnivorism as a means to increase dietary sustainability to those unwilling or unable to give up meat.
