= Carnism =

Ideology that supports the use and consumption of animal products

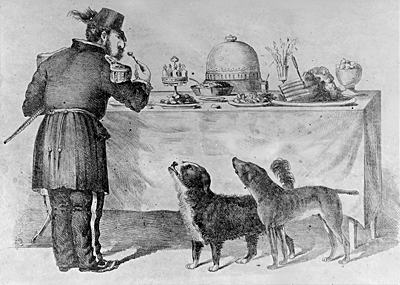
- Joshua Norton eating meat, watched by street dogs Bummer and Lazarus in San Francisco in the 1860s

- A wild boar being attacked by men and hunting dogs
- Description: Psychological theory about the ideology of animal use
- Term coined by: Melanie Joy, 2001
- Related ideas: Anthrozoology, ethics of eating meat, psychology of eating meat, speciesism, veganism, vegetarianism

Carnism is a concept used in discussions of humanity's relation to other animals, defined as a prevailing ideology in which people support the slaughter and hunting of animals, especially for meat. (Note: Gibert, Martin; Desaulniers, Élise (2014): "Carnism refers to the ideology conditioning people to consume certain animal products. It is essentially the opposite of veganism.") Carnism is presented as a dominant belief system supported by a variety of defense mechanisms and mostly unchallenged assumptions. As a dominant ideological system of which meat consumption and animal cruelty are a part, it prescribes norms and beliefs about animal treatment. The term carnism was coined by social psychologist and author Melanie Joy in 2001 and popularized by her book Why We Love Dogs, Eat Pigs, and Wear Cows (2009).

Central to the ideology is the acceptance of meat-eating as "natural", "normal", "necessary", and (sometimes) "nice", known as the "Four Ns". (Note: Joy introduced the "Three Ns of Justification", namely that meat-eating is regarded as "normal, natural, and necessary". A 2015 paper developed this into the "Four Ns": "natural, normal, necessary, and nice".) An important feature of carnism is the classification of only particular species of animal as food, and the acceptance of practices toward those animals that would be rejected as unacceptable cruelty if applied to other species. This classification is culturally relative, so that, for example, dogs are eaten by some people in Korea but may be pets in the West, while cows are eaten in the West but protected in much of India.

== History ==
Analyzing the history of vegetarianism and opposition to it from ancient Greece to the present day, literary scholar Renan Larue found certain commonalities in what he described as carnist arguments. According to him, carnists typically held that vegetarianism is a ludicrous idea unworthy of attention, that mankind is invested with dominion over animals by divine authority, and that abstaining from violence against animals would pose a threat to humans. He found that the views that farmed animals do not suffer, and that slaughter is preferable to death by disease or predation, gained currency in the nineteenth century, but that the former had precedent in the writings of Porphyry, a vegetarian who opposed not only carnism but also opposed lactarianism, wool, and honey.

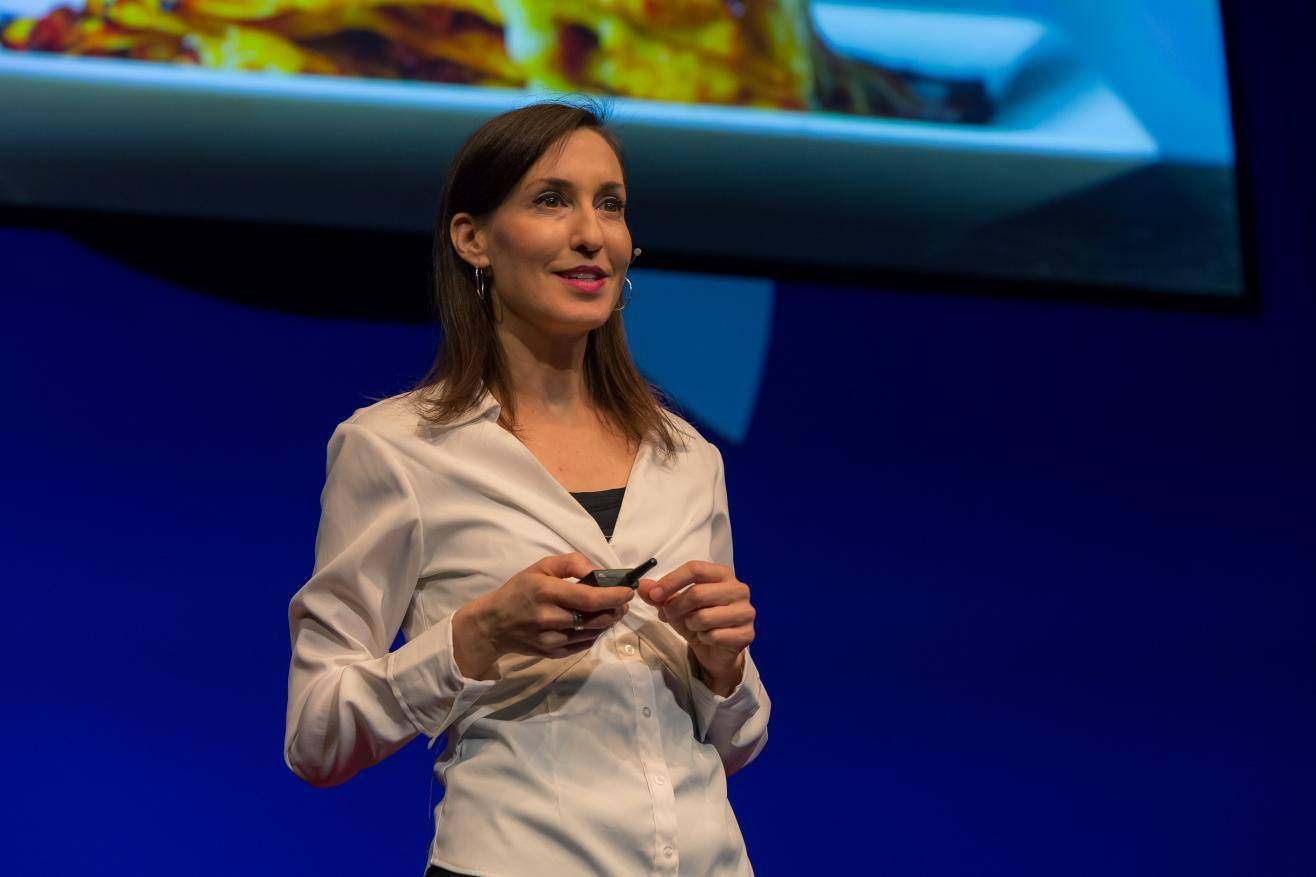
Melanie Joy coined the term carnism in 2001

In the 1970s, traditional views on the moral standing of animals were challenged by animal rights advocates, including psychologist Richard Ryder, who in 1971 introduced the notion of speciesism. This is defined as the assignment of value and rights to individuals solely on the basis of their species membership. In 2001, psychologist and animal rights advocate Melanie Joy coined the term carnism for a form of speciesism that she argues underpins killing animals for meat. Joy compares carnism to patriarchy, arguing that both are dominant normative ideologies that go unrecognized because of their ubiquity:

We don't see meat eating as we do vegetarianism – as a choice, based on a set of assumptions about animals, our world, and ourselves. Rather, we see it as a given, the "natural" thing to do, the way things have always been and the way things will always be. We eat animals without thinking about what we are doing and why, because the belief system that underlies this behavior is invisible. This invisible belief system is what I call carnism.

Sandra Mahlke argues that carnism is the "central crux of speciesism" because the eating of meat motivates ideological justification for other forms of animal exploitation. Abolitionist Gary Francione argues against this that carnism is not a hidden ideology, but a conscious choice; in his view some animals are viewed as food and others family because humans regard non-humans as property, and they may value that property as they please.

== Features ==
=== Edible or inedible ===
Examples of cultural differences

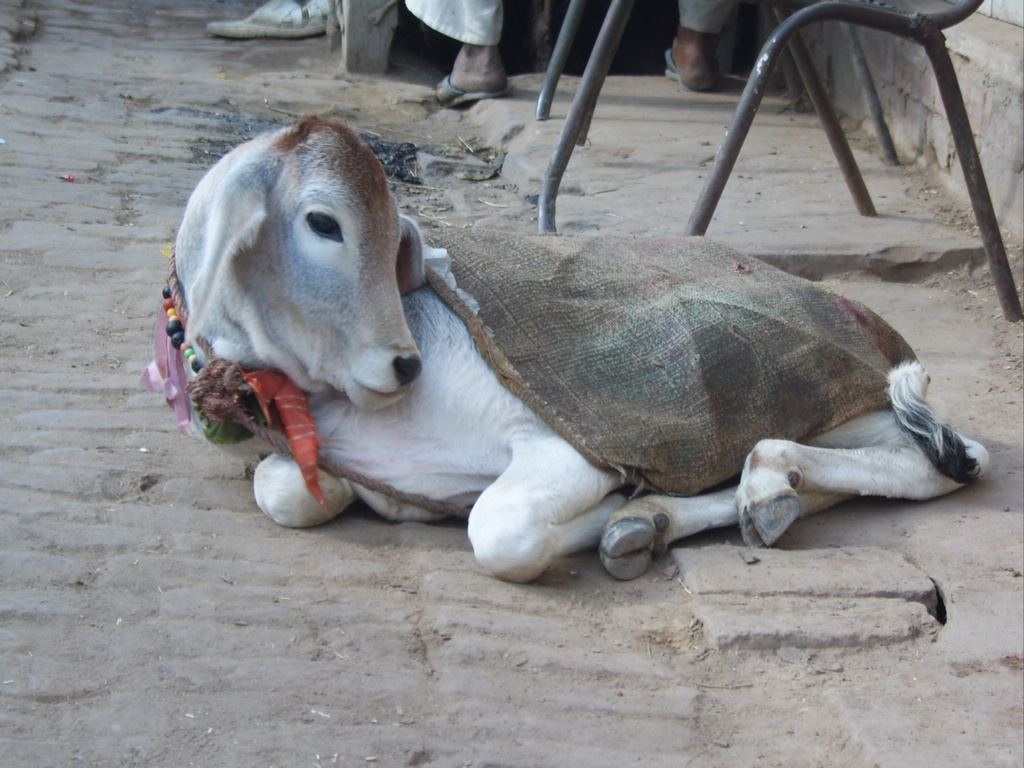
A cow rests in the street in Vrindavan. In some Eastern cultures, cows are revered, whereas in other cultures they are eaten as beef.

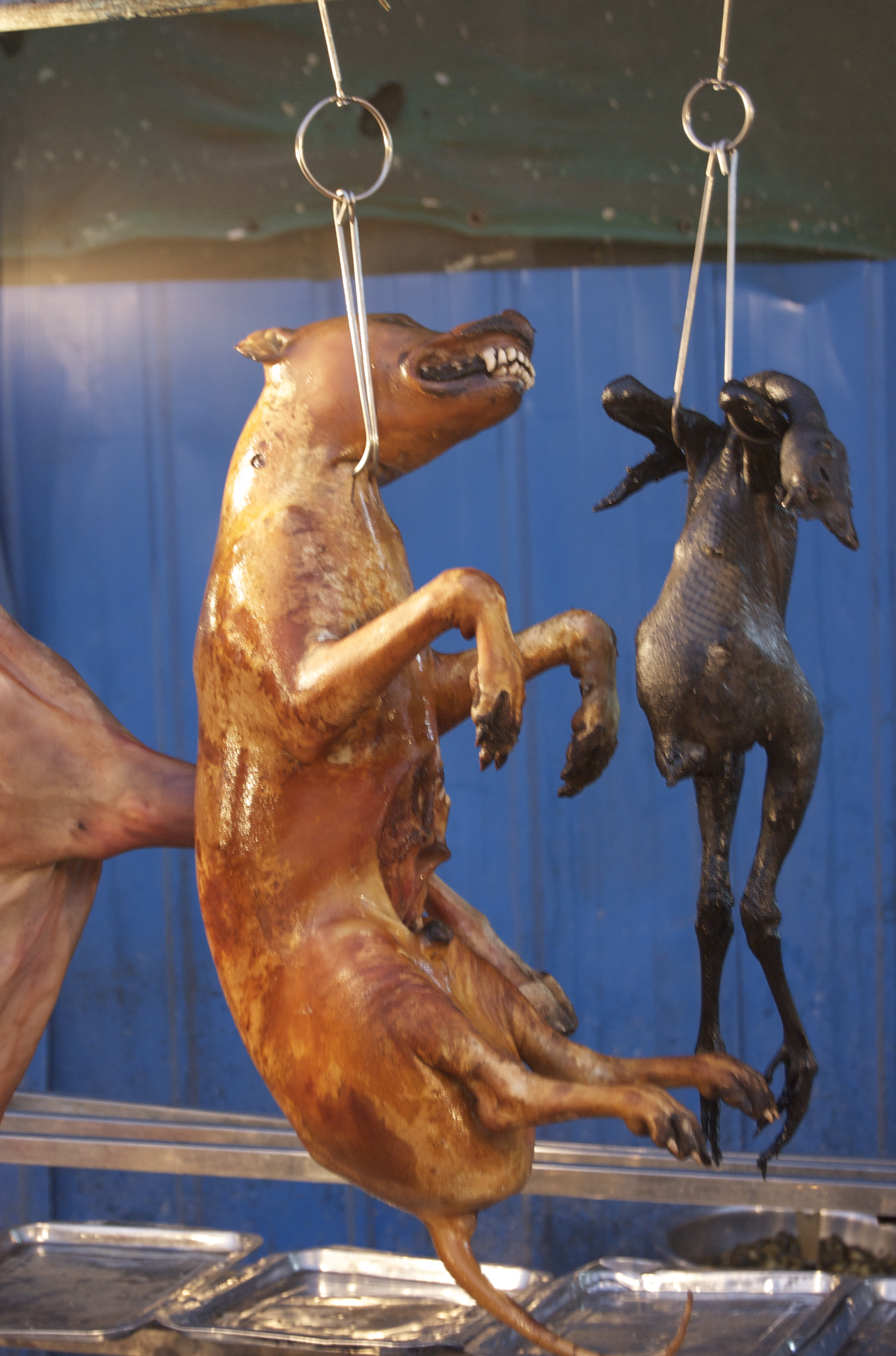
Cooked dog and poultry in China. In some Western cultures, dogs are not eaten as meat but poultry is, whereas in some Eastern cultures dogs are eaten as dog-meat.

A central aspect of carnism is that animals are categorized as edible, inedible, pets, vermin, predators, or entertainment animals, according to people's schemata – mental classifications that determine, and are determined by, our beliefs and desires. There is cultural variability regarding which animals count as food: Dogs are eaten in China and South Korea, but elsewhere are not viewed as food, either because they are loved, or, as in the Middle East and parts of India, regarded as unclean. Cows are eaten in the West but revered in much of India. Pigs are rejected by Muslims and Jews but widely regarded by other groups as edible. Joy and other psychologists argue that these taxonomies determine how the animals within them are treated, influence subjective perceptions of their sentience and intelligence, and reduce or increase empathy and moral concern for them.

=== Meat paradox ===
Jeff Mannes writes that carnism is rooted in a paradox between most people's values and actions: they oppose harming animals, and yet eat them. He argues that this conflict leads to cognitive dissonance, which people attempt to attenuate through psychic numbing. The apparent conflict between caring about animals and embracing non-vegetarian diets has been termed the "meat paradox".

There is experimental evidence supporting the idea that the meat paradox induces cognitive dissonance in Westerners. Westerners are more willing to eat animals which they regard as having lesser mental capacities and moral standing, and conversely, to attribute lesser mental faculties and moral standing to animals which are eaten. Furthermore, the relationship is causative: the categorization of animals as food or not affects people's perception of their mental characteristics, and the act of eating meat itself causes people to attribute diminished mental capacity to animals. For example, in one study people rated an unfamiliar exotic animal as less intelligent if they were told native people hunted it, and in another they regarded cows as less intelligent after eating beef jerky.

Avoiding consideration of the provenance of meat is another strategy. Joy argues that this is why meat is rarely served with the animal's head or other intact body parts.

=== Justification ===
Joy introduced the idea of the "Three Ns of Justification", writing that meat-eaters regard meat consumption as "normal, natural, and necessary". She argues that the "Three Ns" have been invoked to justify other ideologies, including slavery and denying women the right to vote, and are widely recognized as problematic only after the ideology they support has been dismantled.

The argument holds that people are conditioned to believe that humans evolved to eat meat, that it is expected of them, and that they need it to survive or be strong. These beliefs are said to be reinforced by various institutions, including religion, family, and the media. Although scientists have shown that humans can get enough protein in their diets without eating meat, the belief that meat is required persists. Moreover, a 2022 study published in PNAS calls into question the impact of meat consumption on shaping the evolution of the human species.

Building on Joy's work, psychologists conducted a series of studies in the United States and Australia, published in 2015, that found the great majority of meat-eaters' stated justifications for consuming meat were based on the "Four Ns" – "natural, normal, necessary, and nice". The arguments were that humans are omnivores (natural), that most people eat meat (normal), that vegetarian diets are lacking in nutrients (necessary), and that meat tastes good (nice).

Meat-eaters who endorsed these arguments more strongly reported less guilt about their dietary habits. They tended to objectify animals, have less moral concern for them and attribute less consciousness to them. They were also more supportive of social inequality and hierarchical ideologies, and less proud of their consumer choices.

=== "Saved from slaughter" narratives ===
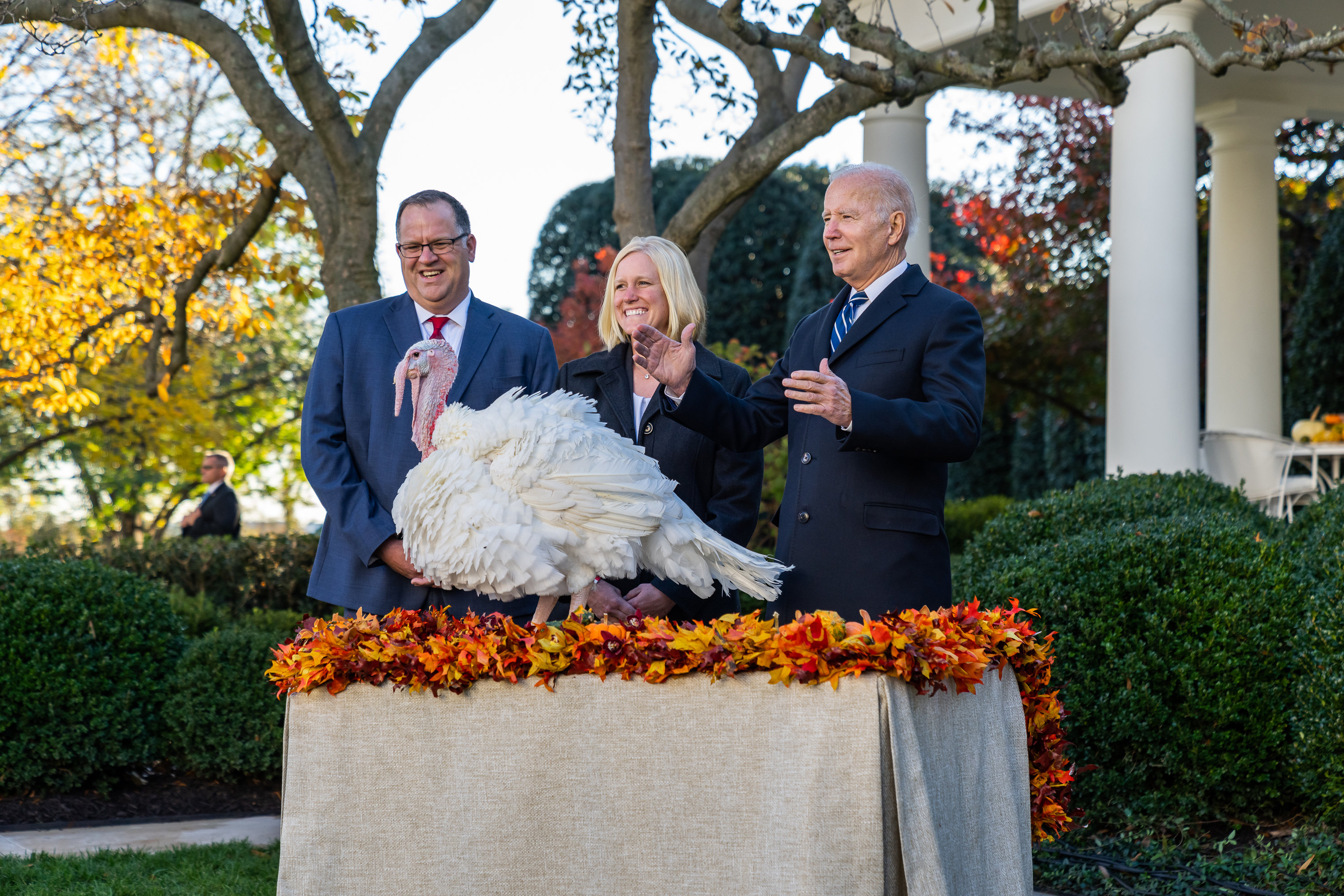
The National Thanksgiving Turkey Presentation, in which the American president pardons a turkey, has been cited as an illustration of carnism.

An illustration of dissonance reduction is the prominence given to "saved from slaughter" stories, in which the media focus on one animal that evaded slaughter, while ignoring the millions that did not. Joy wrote that this dichotomy is characteristic of carnism.

Animals at the center of these narratives include Wilbur in Charlotte's Web (1952); the eponymous and fictional star of Babe (1995); Christopher Hogwood in Sy Montgomery's The Good, Good Pig (2006); the Tamworth Two; Emily the Cow and Cincinnati Freedom. The American National Thanksgiving Turkey Presentation is cited as another example. A 2012 study found that most media reporting on it celebrated the poultry industry while marginalizing the link between living animals and meat.

== Non-academic reception ==
Opinion pieces in The Huffington Post, The Statesman, and The Drum praised the idea, saying the term made it easier to discuss, and challenge, the practices of animal exploitation. An article in the beef industry outlet Drovers Cattle Network criticized the use of the term, saying it implied that eating animal foods was a "psychological sickness".

== See also ==
- Food studies
- Moral psychology
- Non-vegetarianism
- Psychology of eating meat
- Speciesism
- Taboo food and drink
- Veganism
- List of vegan media
