= Psychology of eating meat =

Psychology of human consumption of meat

The psychology of eating meat is an area of study seeking to illuminate the confluence of morality, emotions, cognition, and personality characteristics in the phenomenon of the consumption of meat. Research into the psychological and cultural factors of meat-eating suggests correlations with masculinity, support for hierarchical values, and reduced openness to experience. Because meat eating is widely practiced but is sometimes associated with ambivalence, it has been used as a case study in moral psychology to illustrate theories of cognitive dissonance and moral disengagement. (Note: Rozin (2004): "Meat should be a subject of special interest to psychologists, because it is a quintessential example of the interesting and important state of ambivalence." Loughnan et al. (2010): "Amongst omnivores, evaluations of meat are ambivalent, with negative attitudes partially the result of moral concerns regarding the treatment of animals." Graça et al. (2014): "Results indicate that although participants affirmed personal duties towards preserving the environment, promoting public health, and safeguarding animals from harm, they showed patterns that resemble moral disengagement strategies when discussing impacts associated with current meat production and consumption patterns, and the possibility of change— reconstrual of the harmful conduct; obscuring personal responsibility; disregard for the negative consequences; and active avoidance and dissociation." Loughnan et al. (2014): "The tension omnivores experience when reminded that their behavior may not match their beliefs and values, and the resolution of this tension by changing those beliefs, fits with the theory of cognitive dissonance.") Research into the consumer psychology of meat is relevant to meat industry marketing, as well as for advocates of reduced meat consumption.

== Consumer psychology ==
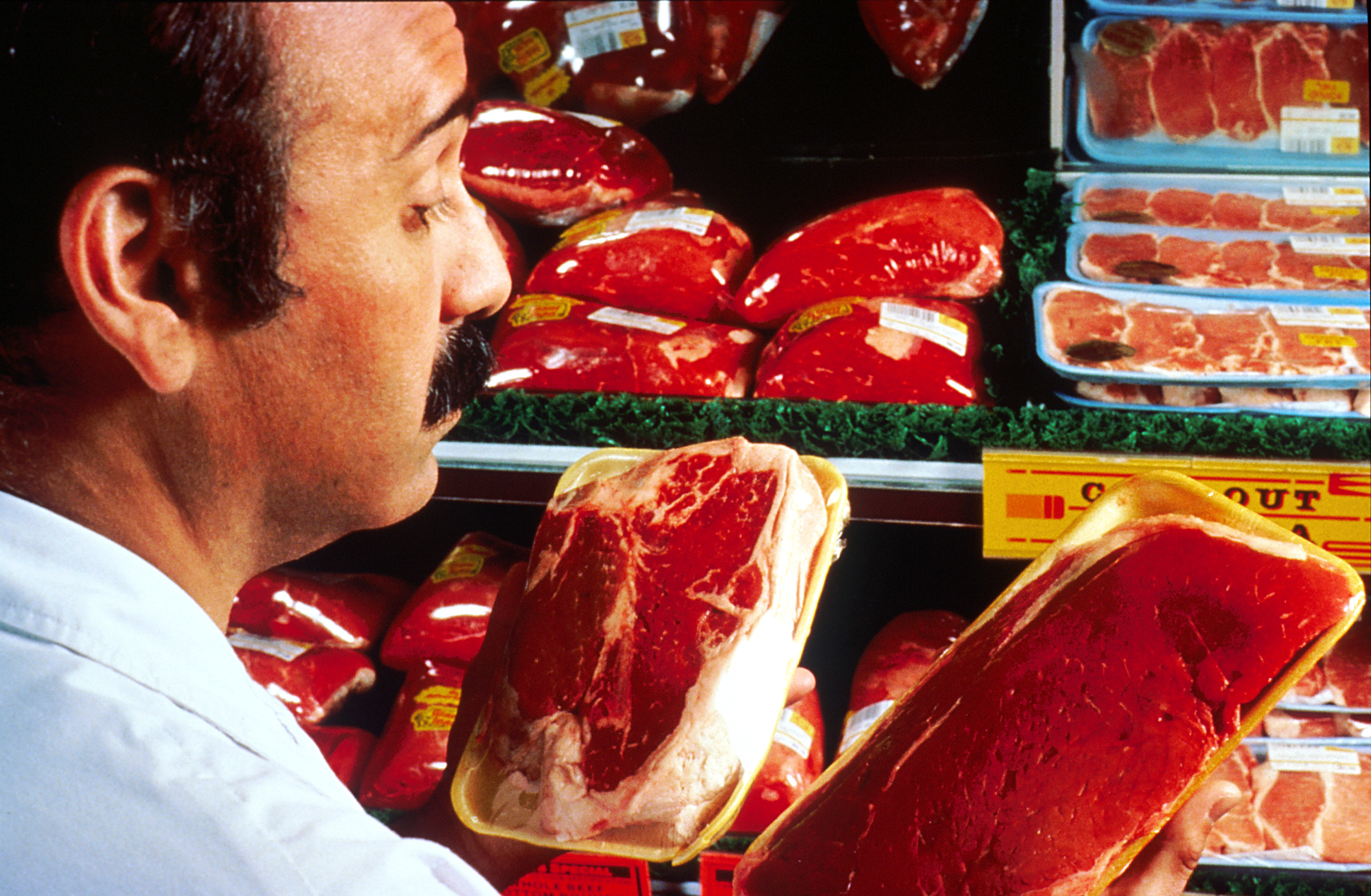
Many factors affect consumer choices about meat, including price, appearance, and source information.

Meat is highly preferred human food. Individuals' attitudes towards meat are of interest to consumer psychologists, the meat industry, and advocates of reduced meat consumption. These attitudes can be affected by issues of price, health, taste, and ethics. The perception of meat concerning these issues affects meat consumption.

Meat is traditionally a high-status food. It may be associated with cultural traditions, and has strong positive associations in most of the world; however, it sometimes has a negative image among consumers, partly due to its associations with slaughter, death, and blood. Holding these associations more strongly may decrease feelings of pleasure from eating meat and increase disgust, leading to lowered meat consumption. In the West, these effects are particularly true among young women. Negative associations may only cause consumers to make meat less noticeable in their diets rather than reducing or eliminating it, for example making meat an ingredient in a more-processed dish. It has been suggested that this is the result of a disconnect between individuals' roles as consumers and as citizens. (Note: Font-i-Furnols (2014): "Meat and meat products have an important role in many Western and non-Western countries from a social and cultural perspective, and they are a central constituent of our meals and diet despite the overall negative beliefs and attitudes toward them. According to Grunert (2006), this apparent contradiction may partially be explained by the distinction between the roles of individuals as consumers and citizens: we may hold a negative attitude toward meat production and consumption as citizens, but it may be weakly displayed in our behavior as consumers.")

Implicit attitudes towards meat vary significantly between omnivores and vegetarians, with omnivores holding much more positive views. Vegetarians may express either revulsion or nostalgia at the thought of eating meat. (Note: A British study found that vegetarians expressed nostalgia specifically for the taste and smell of bacon with "curious regularity".) Consumer behavior towards meat may be modelled by distinguishing the effects of intrinsic factors (properties of the physical product itself, such as color) and extrinsic factors (everything else, including price and brand).

=== Intrinsic factors ===
Taste and texture are self-reported to be important factors in food choice, although this may not accurately reflect consumer behavior. Consumers describe meat as "chewy", "tender", and "rich". People experience the taste and texture of meat in significantly different ways, with variations across ages, genders, and cultures. Tenderness is perhaps the most important of all factors impacting meat eating quality, with others being flavor, juiciness, and succulence.

Visual appearance is one of the primary cues consumers use to assess meat quality at the point of sale, and to select meats. Color is one of the most important characteristics in this context. Different cultural traditions lead consumers to prefer different colors: some countries prefer relatively dark pork overall, some light, and some have no clear preference.

Visible fat content and marbling are also important intrinsic quality cues. Consumers as a whole tend to prefer leaner beef and pork, although significant variations exist across geographical regions. Marbling is important to some consumers but not others, and, as for fat content more generally, preference for marbling varies by region.

=== Extrinsic factors ===
Price is an important extrinsic factor which can affect consumer choices about meat. Price concerns may induce consumers to choose among different meats, or avoid meat altogether. Health concerns are also relevant to consumer choices about meat. The perceived risk of food contamination can affect consumer attitudes towards meat, as after meat-related scares such as those associated with mad cow disease or bird flu. Safety-related product recalls can impact demand for meat. People may reduce or eliminate meat from their diets for perceived health benefits. Health considerations may motivate both meat-eaters and vegetarians. Meatless diets in adolescents can be a way to conceal eating disorders, although vegetarianism does not necessarily increase the risk of disordered eating.

Research suggests consumers tend to prefer meats whose origin lies in their own country over imported products, partly due to the fact that domestic meats are perceived to be of higher quality; this effect may also reflect consumers' ethnocentrism or patriotism. The importance of meat's country of origin varies from country to country.

Beliefs and attitudes about environmental and animal welfare concerns can affect meat consumption. Consumers in the developed world may be willing to pay slightly more for meat produced according to higher animal welfare standards, although welfare and environmental concerns are usually considered less important than attributes more directly related to meat quality, such as appearance. A 2001 study in Scotland found that, although participants cared about animal welfare in general, they considered price and appearance more important than welfare when buying meat. A study of Dutch consumers found that both rational and emotional responses to environmental and other concerns affected purchasing of organic meat.

Meat consumption patterns can also be influenced by individuals' family, friends, and traditions. A study of British eating patterns found that meat was often associated with positive food traditions, such as the Sunday roast. Some consumers only purchase meat conforming with religious prescriptions, such as halal meat. These consumers' trust in quality assurance organizations, and individual relationships with meat providers, have been reported to significantly affect their purchasing behavior. Twenty-first-century trends in animal husbandry, such as biotechnology, factory farming, and breeding animals for faster growth, are expected to have a continuing effect on the evolution of consumer attitudes towards meat.

== Meat paradox ==
One question examined in the psychology of eating meat has been termed the meat paradox: "How can individuals care about animals, but also eat them?" Internal dissonance can be created if people's beliefs and emotions about animal treatment do not match their eating behavior, although it may not always be subjectively perceived as a conflict. This apparent conflict associated with a near-universal dietary practice provides a useful case study for investigating the ways people may change their moral thinking to minimize discomfort associated with ethical conflicts.

The dissonance that arises out of the meat paradox generates a negative interpersonal state. 2010s studies in this area suggest that people can facilitate their practices of meat-eating by attributing lower intelligence and capacity for suffering to meat animals, by thinking of these animals as more dissimilar to humans, by caring less about animal welfare and social inequality, and by dissociating meat products from the animals they come from.

=== Perceptions of meat animals ===
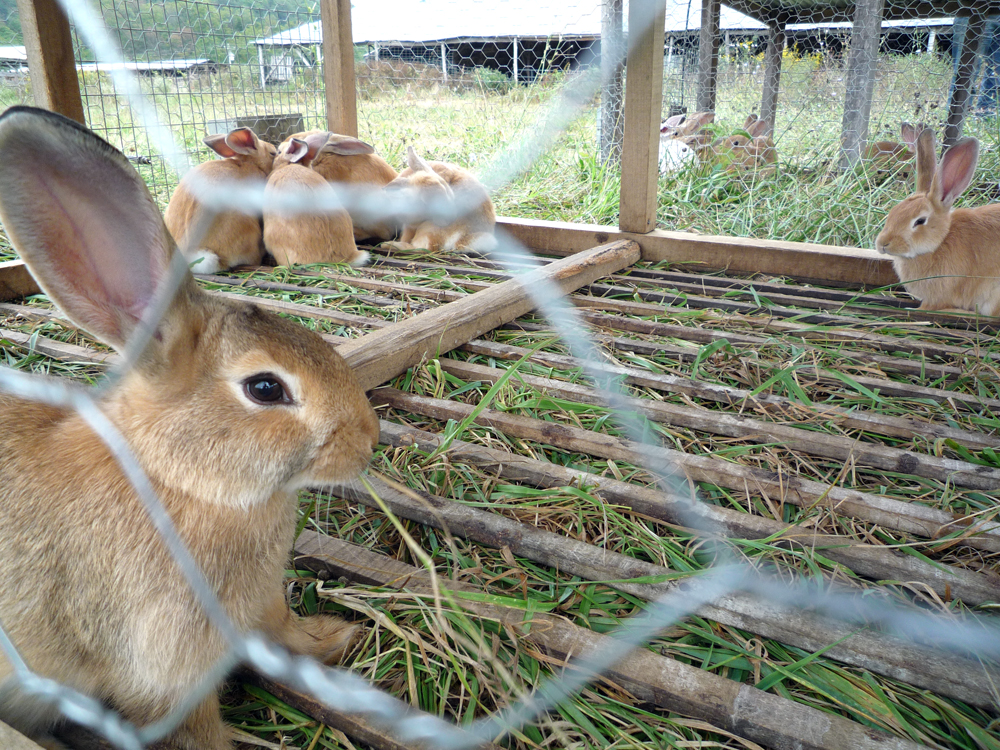
Pastured meat rabbits. Studies suggest that classifying animals as food can affect their perceived intelligence and moral standing.

Ethical conflicts arise when eating animals if they are considered to have moral status. Perceptions of animals' moral status vary greatly, but are determined in part by perceptions of animals as having conscious minds and able to experience pain, and their perceived similarity to humans. Some social psychologists hypothesize that meat eaters can reduce discomfort associated with the meat paradox by minimizing their perception of these morally relevant qualities in animals, particularly animals they regard as food, and several 2010s studies provide support for this hypothesis. It was found, for instance, that by simply being classified within the food animals group, an animal is immediately attributed fewer moral rights.

A 2010 study randomly assigned college students to eat beef jerky or cashews, then judge the moral importance and cognitive abilities of a variety of animals. Compared with students who were given cashews, those who ate beef jerky expressed less moral concern for animals, and assigned cows a diminished ability to have mental states that entail the capacity to experience suffering.

Subsequent studies similarly found that people were more inclined to feel it was appropriate to kill animals for food when they perceived the animals as having diminished mental capacities, a finding replicated in samples from the U.S., Canada, Hong Kong, and India; that, conversely, they perceived unfamiliar animals as having lesser mental capacities when told they were used as food; and, again, that eating meat caused participants to ascribe fewer mental abilities to animals over both the short and long term. Another study showed that rearing animals for slaughter led to less recognition of mental states in cows and sheep for those who expected to eat meat.

A 2014 review suggested that these phenomena could be explained as a set of dissonance reduction techniques used to reduce negative emotions associated with the meat paradox, but noted that the existence of such emotions had not been demonstrated. A 2016 review drew an analogy between the meat paradox and sexual objectification, writing that both practices involve strategically changing perceptions of others when thinking of them as potential "resources" (i.e., for meat or sex), and citing 2010s studies suggesting that sexually objectifying people prompts a reduction in their perceived humanness and moral importance.

=== Dissociation and avoidance ===
Several proposed strategies for resolving the meat paradox dissociate meat as a food product from the animals which produce it, or psychologically distance themselves from the processes of meat production. Although concern for animal welfare has increased in several countries, a trend towards dissociating meat from its animal origins has tended to prevent such concerns from influencing consumer behavior.

People in many cultures do not like to be reminded of the connection between animals and meat, and tend to "de-animalize" meat when necessary to reduce feelings of guilt or of disgust. Meat in Western countries is often packaged and served so as to minimize its resemblance to live animals, without eyes, faces, or tails, and the market share of such products has increased into the 21st century; however, meat in many other cultures is sold with these body parts.

Some authors have suggested that the use of non-animal words such as "sirloin" and "hamburger" for meat can obscure the connection between meat and its animal origins, reducing the psychological discomfort associated with meat consumption. Similarly, the meat industry often prefers euphemisms like "processing" or "harvesting" over "slaughter", which may serve to create emotional distance and make the use of animals more palatable.

The importance of dissociation processes was supported by a 2016 Norwegian study which, in a series of experiments, directly tested the effects of making live animals more salient. In addition to dissociation, people who experience discomfort relating to the meat paradox may simply avoid confrontation of the issue. Cultural socialization mechanisms may also discourage people from thinking of their food choices as harmful; for example, children's books and meat advertisements usually portray farm animals as leading happy lives, or even desiring to be eaten. Compartmentalizing animals in different categories (such as pets, pests, predators, and food animals) may help avoid dissonance associated with differential treatment of different species.

=== Pro-meat attitudes ===
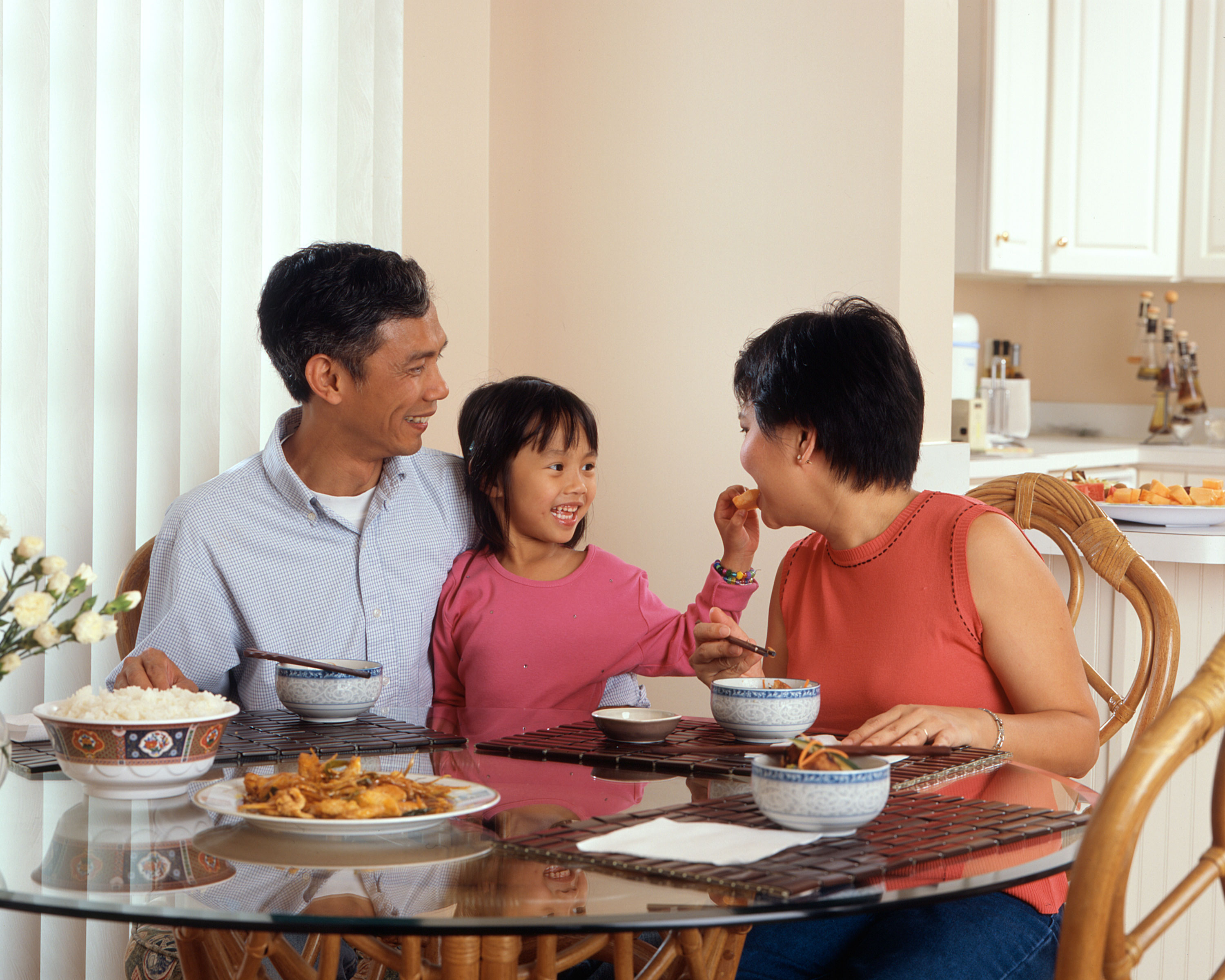
Affective factors, such as positive memories, influence meat consumption.

Ethical conflicts between enjoying meat and caring for animals may be made less problematic by holding positive attitudes towards meat. People who think of meat as safe, nutritious, and sustainable tend to experience less ambivalence about eating it. Religious belief in God-given dominion over animals can also justify eating meat.

A series of studies published in 2015 asked meat-eating American and Australian undergraduates to "list three reasons why you think it is OK to eat meat." Over 90% of participants offered reasons which the researchers classified among the "four N's":

- Appeals to human evolution or to carnivory in nature ("natural")
- Appeals to societal or historical norms ("normal")
- Appeals to nutritive or environmental necessity ("necessary")
- Appeals to the tastiness of meat ("nice")

The researchers found that these justifications were effective in reducing moral tension associated with the meat paradox.

== Personality characteristics ==
Studies in personality trait psychology have suggested that individuals' values and attitudes affect the frequency and comfort with which they eat meat. Those who value power more highly have been found in several studies to eat more meat, while those who prefer self-transcendence values tend to eat less. In particular, studies have found that the personality trait of openness to experience is negatively correlated with meat consumption, and that vegetarians and pesco-vegetarians have more open personalities.

Other research has indicated that meat consumption is correlated with support for hierarchy and inequality values. Those with a social dominance orientation, who more strongly support inequality and hierarchical structures, have been found in some studies to eat more meat; it has been suggested that this is consistent with their preference for having certain groups dominate others (in this case, having humans dominate animals). In addition, research suggests people self-identifying as greater meat eaters have greater right-wing authoritarianism and social dominance orientation. Dhont & Hodson (2014) suggested that this subconsciously indicates their acceptance of cultural tradition, and their rejection of nonconformist animal rights movements. Research also suggests that omnivores score higher in dark triad traits (though not at pathological levels) compared to vegetarians, though the correlations are low, as well as limited due to the small number of vegetarians/vegans available and may also largely be an artefact of gender differences in meat consumption (as males score higher in Dark Triad traits and are also more likely to eat meat; controlling for gender tends to reduce correlations to statistically insignificant levels).

Many of these personality characteristics have been shown to relate with moral disengagement in meat consumption. In particular, individuals with higher levels of moral disengagement in meat consumption also tend to show lower levels of general empathy, experience less self-evaluative emotional reactions (i.e. guilt and shame) when considering the impact of meat consumption, endorse group-based discrimination within humans (social dominance orientation), and display power motives of dominance and support of hierarchy of humans over other species (speciesism, human supremacy beliefs). Additionally, they also tend to display higher general propensity to morally disengage, attribute less importance to moral traits in how they view themselves (moral identity), and eat meat more often.

A detailed study of personality characteristics and diet in Americans characterized the self-descriptions of increased meat consumers as "pragmatic" and "business- and action-oriented", after correcting for gender differences. The idea that "you are what you eat", related to superstitions about sympathetic magic and common in many cultures, may create the perception that eating meat confers animal-like personality attributes. Personality correlates with both eating and avoiding meat can also vary across cultures. For example, in India, vegetarians, relative to omnivores, value their in-group more and express greater respect for authority. They are more likely to be motivated by concerns about pollution, purity and tradition. This contrasts to the United States, where vegetarians are motivated to avoid eating meat by universalism and concerns about animal welfare.

== Masculinity ==
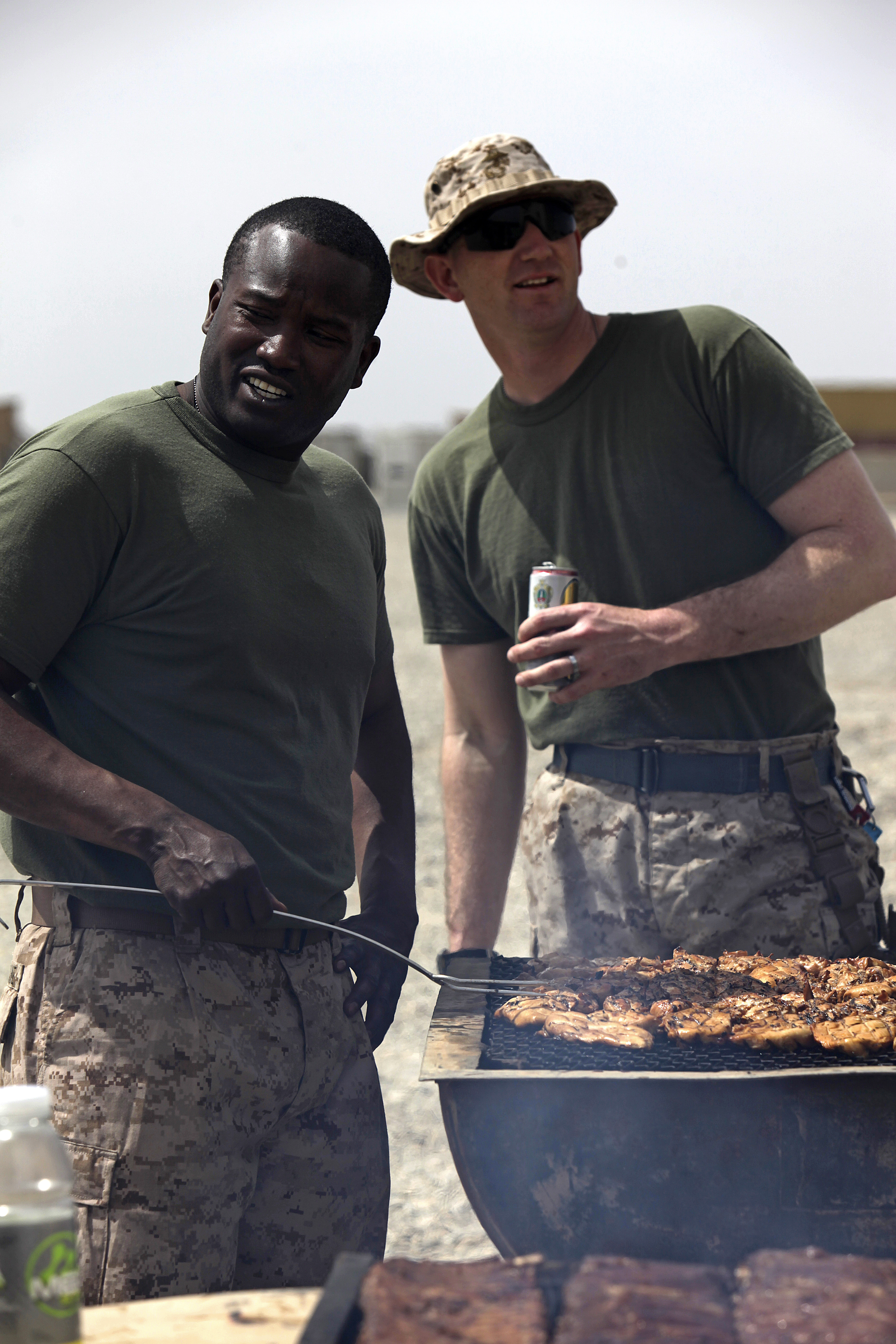
In Western traditions and stereotypes, meat barbecues have a particularly strong connection with masculinity.

Since the 2010s, a considerable amount of social psychology research has investigated the relevance of meat consumption to perceptions of masculinity.

The participants in a series of 2012 studies rated mammalian muscle such as steak and hamburgers as more "male" than other foods, and responded more quickly in an implicit-association test when meat words were paired with typically male names than with female names. In a different study, perceptions of masculinity among a sample of American undergraduates were positively linked to targets' beef consumption and negatively linked to vegetarianism. A 2011 Canadian study found that both omnivores and vegetarians perceived vegetarians as less masculine.

Cultural associations between meat and masculinity are reflected in individuals' attitudes and choices. Across Western societies, women eat significantly less meat than men on average and are more likely to be vegetarian. Women are also more likely than men to avoid meat for ethical reasons. A 2016 review found that male Germans eat more meat than females, linking the discrepancy to the finding that meat in Western culture has symbolic connections to strength and power, which are associated with male gender roles.

Studies have also examined meat-eating in the context of attempts to manage others' impressions of the eater, finding that men whose masculinity had been challenged chose to eat more meat pizza instead of vegetable pizza. These results indicate that it is possible for dietary choices to influence perceptions of the eater's masculinity or femininity, with meat strongly correlated with perceived masculinity. It has been suggested that meat consumption makes men feel more masculine, but it remains unclear whether this is the case and how this may be affected by social context.

== Morality ==
In the course of human evolution, the pressures associated with obtaining meat required early hominids to cooperate in hunting, and in distributing the spoils afterwards. In a 2003 paper, psychologist Matteo Marneli proposed that these pressures created the basic principles of human moral judgements: put simply, he argued, "meat made us moral."

Several studies have found that both meat-eaters and vegetarians tend to consider vegetarians slightly more moral and virtuous than omnivores. Ethical principles are often cited among reasons to stop eating meat. Some evidence suggests meat-eaters may consider vegetarianism an implicit moral reproach, and respond defensively to vegetarian ideas. This is because people tend to regard themselves as morally good and dislike those who they regard as threatening their moral sense of self. Individuals taking action motivated by moral values are seen as implicitly indicting those who do differently due to do-gooder derogation. Because vegetarians often avoid eating meat because of their moral values, meat-eaters believe them to be implicitly casting judgement upon meat eaters' own behaviour. Meat-eaters thus respond to what they see as an implicit attack on their moral standing. Meat-eaters tend to have an exaggerated belief about the extent to which vegetarians consider them morally inferior.

A 2015 study found that Belgian omnivores, semi-vegetarians (flexitarians), and vegetarians have fundamentally different moral outlooks on animal welfare concerns; however, the three groups were found to donate equally to human-focused charities. Other research has shown how moral disengagement operates in the deactivation of moral self-regulatory processes when considering the impact of meat consumption. In particular, a 2016 study offered an interpretation of moral disengagement as a motivated reasoning process which is triggered by loss aversion and dissonance avoidance.

Moral perspectives can have a strong influence on meat consumption, but are not uniform across cultures. In the West, choices about meat eating are known to be associated with moral concerns about animal welfare. In contrast, the psychology of diet in non-Western cultures has been poorly studied, even though important variations exist from region to region; for example, approximately one third of Indians are vegetarian. Research has indicated that, relative to Western vegetarians, Indian vegetarians are more likely to endorse the moral values of purity, legitimate authority, and respect for in-group and tradition.

== See also ==
- Carnism
- Do-gooder derogation
- Ethics of eating meat
- Food psychology
