= Steven L. Davis =

American animal physiologist

Steven L. Davis is an American animal physiologist who specializes in animal ethics. He was a professor of animal science at Oregon State University. Davis has argued that more animals are killed from crop production in a vegan diet than in the production of an omnivorous diet containing grass-fed beef.

== Biography ==
Davis was raised on a family farm in Idaho. His family raised chickens, dairy cows, horses and pigs.

In 1982, Davis was appointed Head of the Department of Animal Science at Oregon State University. His research career was in the study of the endocrinology of growth. He taught the course "Contentious Issues in Animal Agriculture" and developed the course "Ethical Issues in Animal Agriculture" in the 1990s which is required for completion of an animal science degree at the university. The course introduced different arguments in animal ethics.

Davis attended the annual meeting of the American Society of Animal Science in 2009 where he argued that animals have minds that think but differ to humans in their level of intelligence. In 2009, Davis commented that "my research used to center on animal endocrinology - how farm animals can grow better. Now I'm switching to more contentious contemporary issues like animal rights and animal welfare. Animal scientists can no longer avoid the issues, the debate. We've got to be part of the solution".

Davis authored an article with Peter Cheeke arguing that cattle ranchers and environmentalists should consider pursuing common goals such as opposing the industrialization of animal agriculture. He taught the course Ethical Issues in Animal Agriculture until his retirement in 2000.

== New omnivorism ==
Davis has been described as an advocate of "new omnivorism", a position which endorses animal protection but defends meat consumption. In a 2003 paper, Davis argued that the number of animals killed in pasture-raised beef production is less than the number of animals killed in crop production. He concluded that the adoption of an omnivorous diet containing meat and milk from grass-fed cows would cause less harm than the adoption of a vegan diet. The figures that Davis used are debated as he overestimated the number the deaths in arable farming.

Jason Gaverick Matheny (2003) has criticized Davis' conclusion because it calculates the number of animals killed per acre, instead of per consumer. According to Matheny when the numbers are adjusted, Davis' argument shows veganism as perpetrating the least harm to animals. Davis' argument was criticized by Andy Lamey (2007) for being based on only two studies that did not distinguish between animals directly killed by agricultural machinery and animals killed by predators after the harvesting process. Lamey argued that Davis greatly over-estimated the number of mice killed directly by harvesters and that most mice deaths result from predation by other animals after crop harvesting. Bob Fischer and Andy Lamey (2018) objected to Davis' estimations as they involve the misguided generalisation from mice deaths in grain production and concluded that it is unclear at the current time to know how many non-human animals are killed from arable farming.

Although he defends grass-fed beef consumption, Davis opposes intensive animal farming and has called "for the complete abolition of intensive confinement and an end to poultry and pork production". In his ruminant-pasture model of food production, beef and dairy products would replace lamb, pork and poultry products.

== Selected publications ==
- "The Least Harm Principle May Require that Humans Consume a Diet Containing Large Herbivores, Not a Vegan Diet". Journal of Agricultural and Environmental Ethics. 16 (4): 387–394. 2003. doi:10.1023/A:1025638030686.
- Davis, Steven L.; Croney, C. C. (2004). "Defining a Middle Ground for Philosophers and Production: Bioethics". Poultry Science. 83 (3): 310–313. doi:10.1093/ps/83.3.310.
