= Personism =

Ethical philosophy of personhood

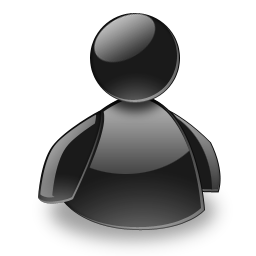
Personism states that being human does not give one exclusive claim to moral rights.

Personism is the moral philosophy of personhood as typified by the thought of the utilitarian philosopher Peter Singer. It amounts to a branch of secular humanism with an emphasis on certain rights-criteria. Personists believe that rights are conferred to the extent that a creature is a person. Michael Tooley provides the relevant definition of a person, saying it is a creature that is "capable of desiring to continue as a subject of experience and other mental states".

A worldview like secular humanism is personism when the empathy and values are extended to the extent that the creature is a person, so for example apes get very similar rights while insects get vastly fewer rights. Consequently, a member of the human species may not necessarily fit the definition of "person" and thereby not receive all the rights bestowed to a person. Hence, such philosophers have engaged in arguing that certain disabled individuals (such as those with a mental capacity that is similar to or is perceived as being similar to an infant) are not persons. This philosophy is also supposedly open to the idea that such non-human persons as machines, animals, and extraterrestrial intelligences may be entitled to certain rights currently granted only to humans. The basic criteria for the entitlement of rights, are the intellect (thinking ability, problem solving in real life circumstances, and not mere calculation), and sometimes empathy, although not necessarily, as not all humans are empathetic; however, indifference in the pain of others and crime are certainly criteria for the deprivation of rights. Genuine empathy is not required to achieve acceptable behavior, but a digital limbic system and a dopaminergic pathways alternative, would deliver a more acceptable result for future MPs judging on rights expansion. Personism may have views in common with transhumanism.

== Details ==
Singer argues that "despite many individual exceptions, humanists have on the whole been unable to free themselves from one of the most central of these Christian dogmas: the prejudice of speciesism." Jaqueline Laing claims that Singer's philosophy has natural conclusions that contradict his own account as well as conflict with common philosophical intuition. In one such feature of his philosophy, Singer argues that fetuses and even newborn humans are not yet persons, and therefore do not have the same rights as an adult human or any other person. Thus, the right to life does not apply to fetuses according to Singer's preference utilitarianism as a non-person can not have preferences (see Singer on abortion, euthanasia, and infanticide). On the other hand, Michael Tooley distinguished between creatures that only have the possibility of becoming a person as he defined it (e.g. fetuses, or spermatozoa and an ovum) and a creature that already has that capacity, and is already owed moral consideration accordingly (e.g. a sleeping person).

Personism holds that certain animals ought to have more rights than they currently possess, including a right to life. Specifically, animals that are self-aware, such as great apes, dolphins, orcas, and elephants, would be recognized as having some of the rights of mentally competent adult humans. Singer himself is a vegetarian, and advocates for vegetarianism. He adds that he is concerned with the rights of any creatures that currently exist, not with "potential" persons. Medical ethicists, characterized in their philosophy as personists, have argued for parents to be allowed to kill their newborn babies because they are not "actual persons" and have received criticism for that position.

== Other uses ==
- Personism can refer to the actual philosophical topic of what constitutes a person.
- Personism can refer to a form of poetry mentioned by Frank O'Hara in which the poem is written directly towards another person.
