= Food Ethics (journal) =

- Discipline: Food ethics
- Language: English
- Edited by: Matthias Kaiser

Publication details
- History: 2016–present
- Publisher: Springer Science+Business Media
- Open access: Hybrid

Standard abbreviations
- ISO 4: Food Ethics

Indexing
- ISSN: 2364-6853 (print); 2364-6861 (web)

Food Ethics: A Journal of the Societies for Agricultural and Food Ethics is a peer-reviewed academic journal published by Springer Science+Business Media that was established in 2016. It is linked to the European Society for Agricultural and Food Ethics and the Asian-Pacific Society for Agricultural and Food Ethics. The journal covers a range of academic disciplines addressing food ethics. The editor-in-chief is Matthias Kaiser.

== Abstracting and indexing ==
The journal is abstracted and indexed by CAB Abstracts, EBSCO databases, the Philosopher's Index, ProQuest databases, and Scopus.
