= Carbon Balance and Management =

- Discipline: Environmental science
- Language: English

Publication details
- History: 2006–present
- Publisher: BioMed Central

Standard abbreviations
- ISO 4: Carbon Balance Manag.

Indexing
- ISSN: 1750-0680
- OCLC no.: 70640931

Links
- Journal homepage

Carbon Balance and Management is a peer-reviewed open-access scientific journal published by BioMed Central. The journal covers research on the global carbon cycle. The journal was established in 2006 and is abstracted and indexed in PubMed, Agricola, CAB International, Chemical Abstracts Service, EMBASE, and Scopus.
