= The Vegan Studies Project =

Book

- Author: Laura Wright
- Publisher: University of Georgia Press
- Publication date: 2015
- ISBN: 978-0820348568

The Vegan Studies Project: Food, Animals, and Gender in the Age of Terror (2015) by Laura Wright coined the term and proposed the academic field of vegan studies and serves as the field's foundational text.

== Proposing the field of vegan studies ==
The book was the first to propose an academic field, vegan studies, to study veganism as an identity, lifestyle and ideology, as well as to analyze historical and contemporary reception and depiction of veganism.

=== Reaction ===
Some reviewers and academics embraced the identification of a new field of study, calling the book a "foundational work" and "the foundational text for the nascent field" of vegan studies. In her foreword to the book, Carol J. Adams says, "Thanks to this work, we now have a new category: the vegan studies-loving vegan."

In 2016 Kathryn Dolan said in the journal Interdisciplinary Studies in Literature and Environment that it "will clearly become an area of further study." Emelia Quinn and Benjamin Westwood called the book "the first major academic monograph" on veganism and the humanities. Jodey Castricano and Rasmus R. Simonsen called it "the first vegan studies monograph to be published by a university press."

In 2018 Dario Martinelli and Ausra Berkmaniene said "The presence and legitimacy of 'vegan studies' within the academic world, especially since Wright cared to formalize the expression and define a paradigm, is something that should no longer require an explanation or a justification," and that in writing the book Wright had "coined the expression".

In 2019 Marzena Kubisz called The Vegan Studies Project "the monograph which creates the foundations for vegan studies".

Other academics were less sure the book had created a new field. In 2016 Fabio Parasecoli said he was "not sure if Wright's intention to open a whole new field of inquiry and scholarship will come to fruition, but she definitely offers many arguments that deserve attention and reflection." In 2018 Josh Milburn said he would if offered the opportunity teach a vegan studies course, but that he remained "unsure whether there truly is a literature sufficiently unified to be labelled a new discipline."

== Reception ==
Public Books called positing a new academic field an "audacious gambit." Milburn said it "provocatively called for" a new academic field. Dolan, writing in the journal Interdisciplinary Studies in Literature and Environment, said Wright proposes "a new area she names 'vegan studies'" and calls her style "clear and personable." HuffPost said it "offers many arguments that deserve attention and reflection." University of Sunderland veganism and animal studies researcher Alex Lockwood said it "launched the new academic field of vegan studies." Alice Crary called it "groundbreaking." Quinn and Westwood called the book "the first major academic monograph" on veganism and the humanities and said it suggests how vegan scholars might situate themselves theoretically. Castricano and Simonsen called it "an important book" and "the first vegan studies monograph to be published by a university press."

== Impact ==
In 2016 Renan Larue, author of Le végétarisme et ses ennemis (2014), began teaching a vegan studies course at the University of California, Santa Barbara. In May 2016 the conference Towards a Vegan Theory, with Wright keynoting, was held at the University of Oxford to discuss the place of vegan theory within the humanities.

In 2016 the collection Critical Perspectives on Veganism was published, with editors Casatricano and Simonsen introducing it as a vegan studies text. In 2017 Peter Adkins placed "Ulysses in dialogue with recent writings on...the emergence of what is being termed 'vegan studies' to suggest a vegetarian reading of Joyce’s novel," citing the book. Wright has since edited two collections, Through a Vegan Studies Lens: Textual Ethics and Lived Activism, (2019) and The Routledge Handbook of Vegan Studies (2021).

Appalachian State University offered a fall 2019 Honors Seminar, What is Vegan Studies? Exploring an Emerging Field, saying that with the book's publication "a powerful transdisciplinary field has emerged which is in turn influencing work across the disciplines" and called the book and Wright's more recent works the field's "founding texts".
