= Vegan studies =

Academic field

Vegan studies or vegan theory is the study of veganism, within the humanities and social sciences, as an identity and ideology, and the exploration of its depiction in literature, the arts, popular culture, and the media. In a narrower use of the term, vegan studies seek to establish veganism as a "mode of thinking and writing" and a "means of critique".

As an academic field, vegan studies examines how veganism shapes and is shaped by culture, ethics, politics, and representation, offering a framework for understanding vegan identity and its social implications.

Working within a variety of disciplines, scholars discuss issues such as the commodity status of animals, carnism, veganism and ecofeminism, veganism and race, and the effect of animal farming on climate change. Closely related to critical animal studies, vegan studies can be informed by critical race theory, environmental studies and ecocriticism, feminist theory, postcolonialism, posthumanism, and queer theory, incorporating a range of empirical and non-empirical research methodologies.

The field first began to enter the academy in the 2010s, and in 2015 was proposed as a formal field of study by Laura Wright.

== Development ==
The development of vegan studies emerged gradually from several overlapping intellectual movements, including the animal turn of the 1970s–1980s, the rise of human–animal studies and critical animal studies in the early 2000s, and the growth of vegetarian and vegan scholarship across feminist theory, environmental humanities, and cultural studies. By the mid‑2010s, these strands converged into a recognizable academic field.

=== Animal turn ===
Several works of philosophy and ecofeminism in the 1970s and 1980s—including Peter Singer's Animal Liberation (1975), Carolyn Merchant's The Death of Nature (1980), and Tom Regan's The Case for Animal Rights (1983)—triggered an animal turn in the humanities and social sciences: an increased interest in human–nonhuman relations. (Note: Joshua Abram Kercsmar (The Journal of American History, March 2017): "The environmental concerns that have rippled through academe since the 1970s prompted scholars to consider human-animal relationships from a variety of perspectives. Texts such as Peter Singer's Animal Liberation (1975), Carolyn Merchant's The Death of Nature (1980), and Tom Regan's The Case for Animal Rights (1983) marked the start of an 'animal turn' that infiltrated the humanities and social sciences and drew heavily on feminist and Marxist theories.")

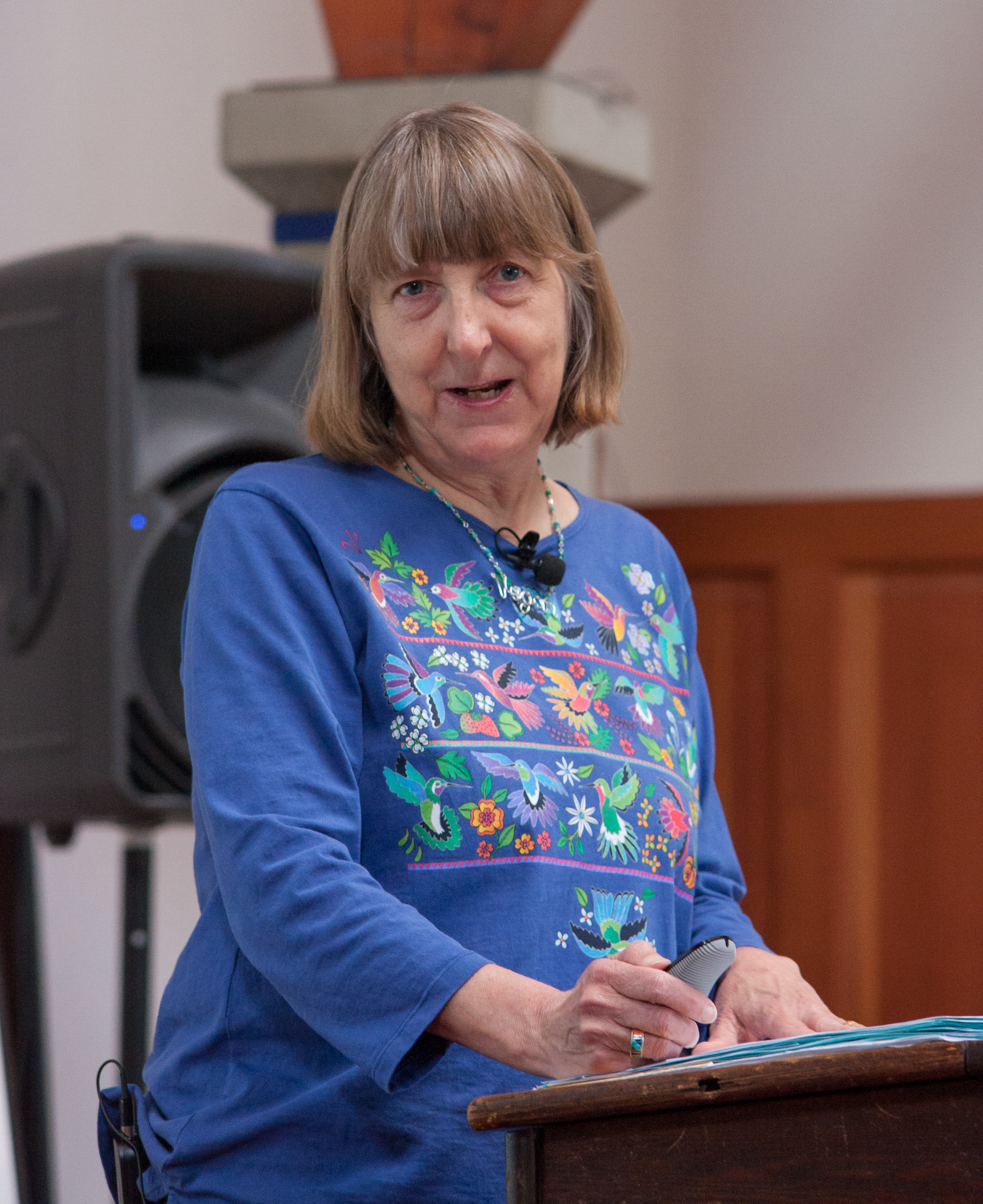
Carol J. Adams's The Sexual Politics of Meat (1990) became influential within vegan studies.

The period led to the development of human–animal studies, which examines how humans and nonhumans interact, (Note: Lori Gruen (Critical Terms for Animal Studies, 2018): "When scholars first began describing their work as Animal Studies, there was occasionally confusion—some people, including many scientists, thought that meant scholars were working directly with animals, for example, in laboratories or in the wild. This led some scholars to adopt the name Human–Animal Studies (HAS) and emphasize the relationships that the field was devoted to examining, understanding, and critically evaluating.") and, in the early 2000s, to critical animal studies (CAS), an academic field dedicated to studying and ending the exploitation of animals. Named in 2007, CAS grew directly out of the animal liberation movement. Criticizing human–animal studies as anthropocentric, and aiming instead for "total liberation" (including of humans), CAS scholars reject "speciesism and anthropocentric ethics" and declare themselves committed to the "abolition of animal and ecological exploitation, oppression and domination". (Note: The Institute for Critical Animal Studies defines critical animal studies (CAS) as "the academic field of study dedicated to the abolition of animal and ecological exploitation, oppression, and domination. CAS is grounded in a broad, global, emancipatory, inclusionary movement for total liberation and freedom.") Veganism is "a baseline for CAS praxis".

In the 1990s, several works of vegetarian studies appeared, informing the later development of vegan studies. These included Carol J. Adams's The Sexual Politics of Meat (1990), described as one of vegan studies' foundational texts, which deployed the idea of the "absent referent:" "The function of the absent referent is to keep our 'meat' separated from any idea that she or he was once an animal ... to keep something from being seen as having been someone." Adams linked vegetarianism to feminism, arguing that "the killing of animals for food is a feminist issue that feminists have failed to claim". Other works that influenced vegan studies include Nick Fiddes's Meat: A Natural Symbol (1991); Colin Spencer's The Heretic's Feast (1996); Tristram Stuart's The Bloodless Revolution (2006); and Rod Preece's Sins of the Flesh: A History of Ethical Vegetarian Thought (2008), published by the University of British Columbia Press.

=== Entry into the academy ===
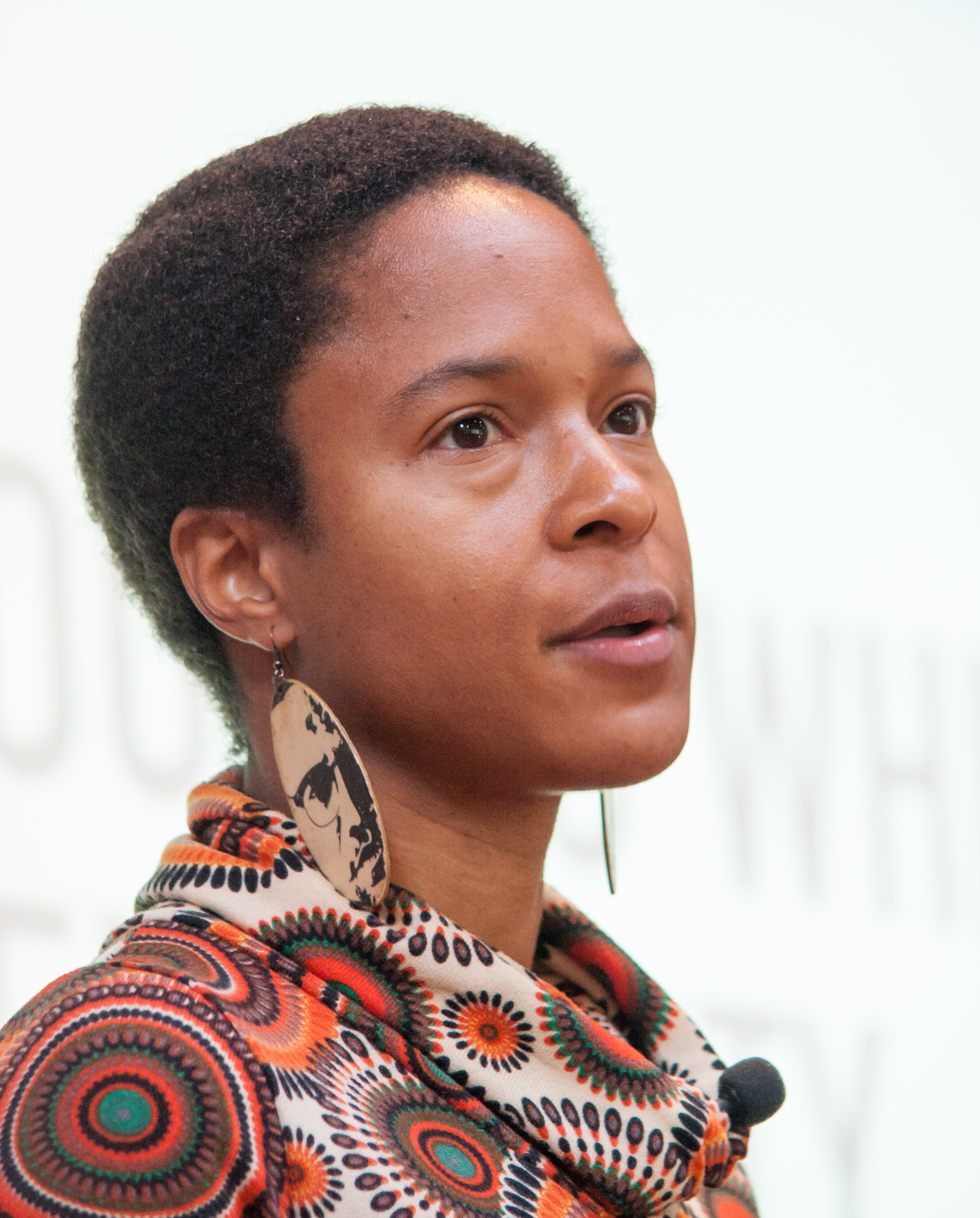
A. Breeze Harper

In 2010 a United Nations Environment Programme report recommended a global move toward a vegan diet, which over the following decade became increasingly mainstream in the Western world. According to University of Oxford English literature scholars Emelia Quinn and Benjamin Westwood, veganism's "entry into the academy" also began around 2010. Shortly after the publication of her 2010 edited collection, Sistah Vegan: Black Female Vegans Speak on Food, Identity, Health, and Society, A. Breeze Harper sought to apply "critical race and black feminist studies to vegan studies in the US". That year, the Journal for Critical Animal Studies published an edition devoted to the perspectives of women of color, which had been "eerily absent from critical animal studies and vegan studies in general".

In December 2013, Keele University media scholar Eva Giraud discussed the relationship between veganism, animal studies, ecofeminism, and posthumanism. (Note: Eva Giraud (PhaenEx, 2013): "Veganism is becoming a prominent area of focus in contemporary cultural theory because debates about vegan praxis have emerged as a sub-field of animal studies that crystallises tensions between CAS and posthumanist-inflected 'mainstream' animal studies. By grounding itself in notions of the inviolable rights of animals ... veganism seems to be underpinned by the humanist ethical frameworks that mainstream animal studies is moving away from in its turn to posthumanism.") Academic work on veganism appeared in Nik Taylor and Richard Twine's 2014 collection, The Rise of Critical Animal Studies: From the Margins to the Centre, and in December 2014, Quinn and Westwood addressed a workshop at the University of York, organized by the art historian Jason Edwards for the 70th anniversary of the founding of the Vegan Society in the UK, to discuss "the fast developing field of vegan theory".

=== Proposal as a formal field of study ===
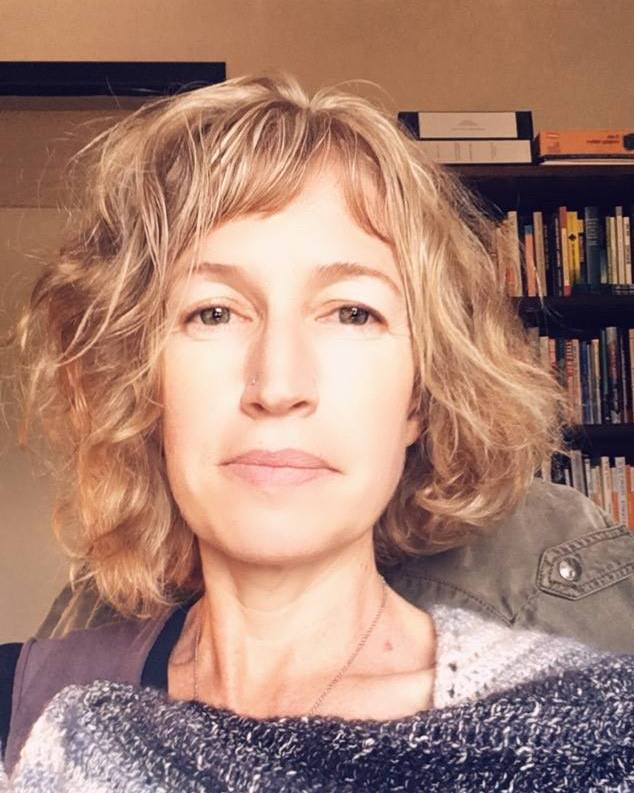
Laura Wright's The Vegan Studies Project (2015) proposed the academic field.

Vegan studies were proposed as a new academic field by Western Carolina University English professor Laura Wright in October 2015 in her book The Vegan Studies Project: Food, Animals, and Gender in the Age of Terror, published by the University of Georgia Press and described as the "first major academic monograph in the humanities focused on veganism". Wright describes vegan studies as a "lived and embodied ethic" providing "a new lens for ecocritical textual analysis". Her work was prompted by research, for her doctoral dissertation, into J. M. Coetzee's Disgrace (1999) and The Lives of Animals (1999), and was influenced by Adams's The Sexual Politics of Meat. Wright framed vegan studies as "inherently ecofeminist", according to the literary scholar Caitlin Stobie.

In 2016, Quinn and Westwood organized a conference at Wolfson College, Oxford, Towards a Vegan Theory, at which Wright gave the keynote address and Renan Larue, associate professor at the University of California, Santa Barbara, taught a course called "Introduction to Vegan Studies"

Other works in vegan studies include Jodey Castricano and Rasmus R. Simonsen's 2016 Palgrave Macmillan collection, Critical Perspectives on Veganism, a special cluster in the journal ISLE in December 2017, and a 2018 Palgrave Macmillan collection edited by Quinn and Westwood, Thinking Veganism in Literature and Culture: Towards a Vegan Theory, based on their 2016 Oxford conference. Through a Vegan Studies Lens: Textual Ethics and Lived Activism (2019) was published by the University of Nevada Press and edited by Wright. Wright also edited The Routledge Handbook of Vegan Studies (2021).

In 2021, Quinn wrote The Monstrous Vegan: Reading Veganism in Literature, 1818 to Present.

== Characteristics ==
=== Scope, relationship to CAS ===
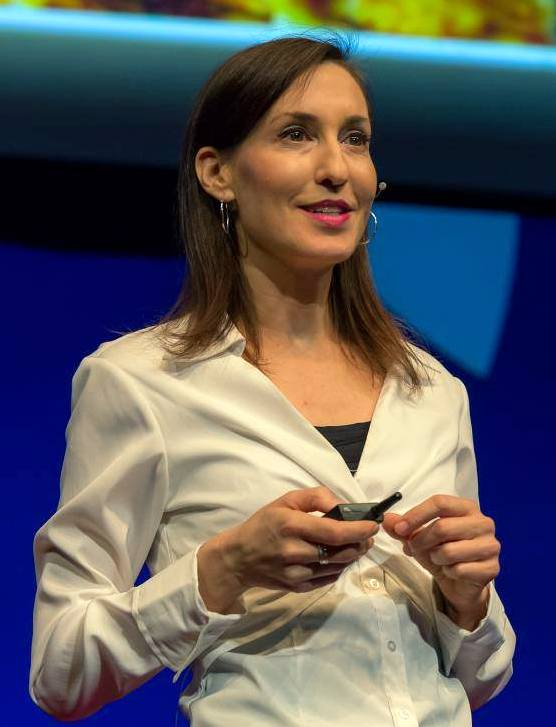
Melanie Joy

In 2016, Melanie Joy and Jens Tuider called vegan studies a "field of research whose time has come". It establishes veganism as an academic topic; gathers research on veganism, the history of veganism and carnism; examines veganism's ethical, political and cultural basis and repercussions; and explores how vegan identity is presented in literature, the arts, film, popular culture, advertising and the media.

According to Núria Almiron et al. (2018), vegan studies highlight the "oppositional role played by veganism towards ideologies that legitimate oppression" and how the media may misrepresent veganism. They view vegan studies and critical animal studies (CAS) as "related branches in the evolution of critical approaches to human domination". According to Alex Lockwood, a CAS theorist at the University of Sunderland, vegan studies offers a "radical and more coherent way of ensuring the present experiences of all beings are taken into account when examining the ways in which discourse shapes power".

=== Vegan studies analysis ===
==== Examples ====
Vegan studies scholars examine texts "via an intersectional lens of veganism", according to Wright, to explore the relationship of humans to their food sources and the environment. She offers as an example of a vegan studies analysis a 2017 article by Caitlin E. Stobie in ISLE about The Vegetarian by Han Kang, winner of the 2016 Man Booker International Prize. The novel tells the story of Yeong-hye who, after dreaming about animal slaughter, decides to stop eating animal products and refuses to have them in the house. She becomes increasingly distanced from her family and society, and slits her wrist when her father tries to force her to eat meat. "Can only trust my breasts now. I like my breasts; nothing can be killed by them. Hand, foot, tongue, gaze, all weapons from which nothing is safe." Rather than interpreting this as mental illness, Stobie views Yeong-hye's actions, according to Wright, as "a posthumanist performance of vegan praxis dependent upon inarticulable trauma and the desire for intersectional and interspecies connection".

Another example is Sara Salih's account, in Quinn and Westwood's 2018 collection, of "three scenes of failed witness", including when Salih left a formal lunch in tears when the chicken dish arrived, and when she and others stood staring (pointlessly, she felt at the time) at slaughterhouse workers using electric prods to push pigs off a lorry. Salih argues that there is, in fact, an ethical purpose to witnessing such acts. The witnessing outside the slaughterhouse was a performative act, an "illegal act un-sanctioning", directed at the workers. The third scene was when she left a friend's home, again in tears, having agreed to help prepare a meal, when her friend "dropped something soft and bloody into the frying pan".

Salih turns to Giorgio Agamben's Remnants of Auschwitz: The Witness and the Archive, comparing the Muselmänner in the camps, the "moving threshold in which man passed into non-man", to the "animalization of animals in slaughterhouses". At the time, she was feeding standard cat food to seven cats. "Why", she asks Derrida, who wrote about his cat in The Animal That Therefore I Am (2008), "have you chosen to turn towards this animal rather than that one?" She suggests that the scale of suffering makes "[o]ur imaginations baulk"; it seems absurd to understand that "we are in the presence of the dead ... when faced with a scoopful of kibble". Nevertheless she advises: "Look as closely as you can at your bowl or the neighbour's bowl or the cat's bowl, bear witness, and then decide whether the current norms of logic or rationality possess any moral validity."

==== In art ====
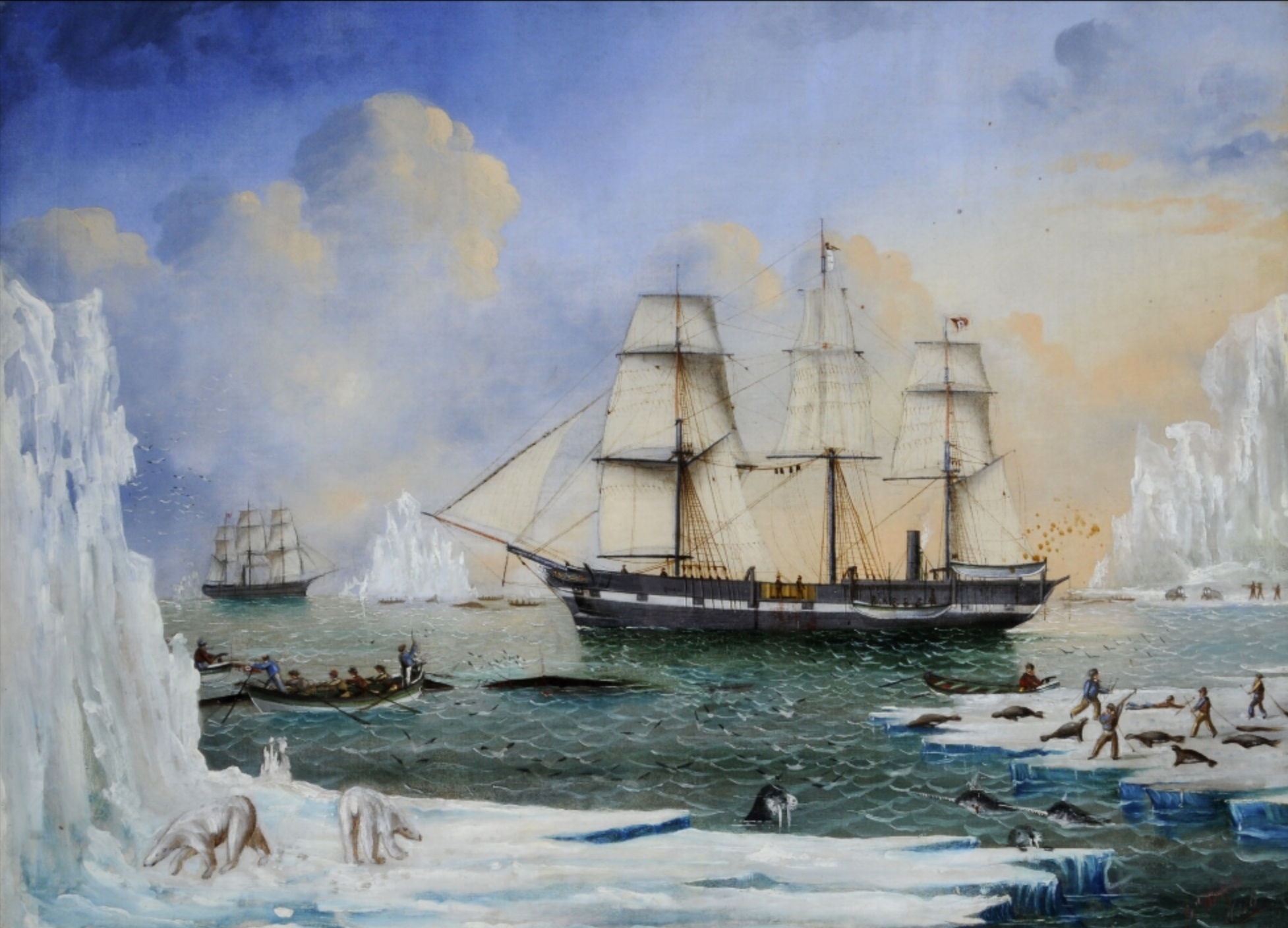
Diana and Chase in the Arctic, c. 1857; more detail is visible at the University of York History of Art Research Portal.

The British art historian Jason Edwards offers a vegan studies analysis of Diana and Chase in the Arctic (c. 1857) by James H. Wheldon. Diana and Chase were whalers from Hull, England. Between 1815 and 1825, Hull had 60 whalers, the largest whaling fleet in Britain. The animals were killed for their blubber, from which the oil was extracted to make candles, fuel lamps, and lubricate machinery.

The painting shows groups of men pursuing whales, walruses, and seals. Several men from the Diana are clubbing six seals. Three men are about to shoot two walruses. The whales are not easy to find in the painting, which aligns the viewer with the whalers. One whale has been harpooned and is bleeding, while three others are being chased. Two narwhals on the right appear injured and one is bleeding; Edwards writes that Wheldon fashioned these after John Ward's narwhals in The "Swan" and "Isabella" (c. 1840). The whales can probably hear each other struggling and dying, Edwards writes, but sound is "conspicuously absent from the eerily silent world of Wheldon's canvas".

Wheldon signed the canvas with the same vermillion paint he used for the blood and some of the whalers' clothes: "it is as if Wheldon is saying, 'this is a scene of moral darkness that I acknowledge as mine.'" Edwards suggests we also look for animals in the raw materials: the horsehair (or hog or badger) brushes and spermaceti candles. Seeking to introduce the perspective of ethical vegans, whose responses are probably very different from the majority, "their carnivorous or omnivorous viewing peers", Edwards feels the need to place himself between the bodies of the hunters and the animals, and between carnivorous viewers and the painting.

== Sources ==
=== Works cited ===
- Adams, Carol J. (2015a) [1990]. The Sexual Politics of Meat: A Feminist-Vegetarian Critical Theory. New York and London: Bloomsbury Academic. ISBN 978-1-5013-1283-0.
- Adkins, Peter (2017). "The Eyes of That Cow: Eating Animals and Theorizing Vegetarianism in James Joyce's Ulysses". Humanities. 6 (46): 46. doi:10.3390/h6030046. hdl:20.500.11820/9ff4960b-064d-4cc4-a54c-a0a1f50fbff9.
- Almiron, Núria; Cole, Matthew; Freeman, Carrie P. (1 August 2018). "Critical Animal and Media Studies: Expanding the Understanding of Oppression in Communication Research" (PDF). European Journal of Communication. 33 (4): 367–380. doi:10.1177/0267323118763937. S2CID 53513582.
- Blanchard, Elodie Vieille (2018). Révolution végane: Inventer un autre monde. Malakoff, Paris: Dunod. ISBN 978-2100777204.
- Boulo, Justine (27 November 2017). "Pourquoi déteste-t-on les vegans?". Slate.fr. Archived from the original on 27 November 2017.
- Burnouf, Sylvie (23 September 2017). "Eleveurs et végans, un dialogue impossible?". Le Monde.
- Castricano, Jodey; Simonsen, Rasmus R. (2016). "Introduction: Food for Thought". In Castricano, Jodey; Simonsen, Rasmus R. (eds.). Critical Perspectives on Veganism. Basingstoke, England: Palgrave Macmillan. pp. 1–11. ISBN 978-3-319-33418-9.
- Cugnier, Stéphane (11 April 2016). "Un Breton enseigne le végétarisme en Californie". Ouest-France.
- DeMello, Margo (2012). Animals and Society: An Introduction to Human-Animal Studies. New York: Columbia University Press. ISBN 978-0231526760.
- Dicks, Brett Leigh (19 April 2016). "Animal Ethics 101" (PDF). Santa Barbara News-Press. Archived (PDF) from the original on 6 January 2019.
- Edwards, Jason (2018). "The Vegan Viewer in the Circum-Polar World; or, J. H. Wheldon's the Diana and Chase in the Arctic (1857)" (PDF). In Quinn, Emelia; Westwood, Benjamin (eds.). Thinking Veganism in Literature and Culture: Towards a Vegan Theory. Palgrave Studies in Animals and Literature. Cham, Switzerland: Palgrave Macmillan. pp. 79–106. doi:10.1007/978-3-319-73380-7_4. ISBN 978-3319733791.
- Fiddes, Nick (1991). Meat: A Natural Symbol. Abingdon and New York: Routledge. ISBN 978-0415089296.
- Forson, Psyche Williams; Counihan, Carole, eds. (2012). "Contributors". Taking Food Public: Redefining Foodways in a Changing World. New York and Abingdon: Routledge. ISBN 978-0415888547.
- Garcia, Léna (15 March 2016). "What Vegans Study". Santa Barbara Independent. Archived from the original on 17 March 2016.
- Giraud, Eva (26 December 2013). "Veganism as Affirmative Biopolitics: Moving Towards a Posthumanist Ethics?". PhaenEx. 8 (2): 47–79. doi:10.22329/p.v8i2.4087.
- Grant, Juawana; MacKenzie-Dale, Brittni (2016). "Lisa Simpson and Darlene Connor: Television's Favorite Killjoys". In Castricano, Jodey; Simonsen, Rasmus R. (eds.). Critical Perspectives on Veganism. Basingstoke, England: Palgrave Macmillan. pp. 307–329. ISBN 978-3-319-33418-9.
- Gruen, Lori (2018). Critical Terms for Animal Studies. Chicago and London: University of Chicago Press. ISBN 978-0226355399.
- Harper, A. Breeze (11 February 2010a). "Critical Race and Veg*n Studies Intersect: Research Group". The Sistah Vegan Project. Archived from the original on 18 September 2012.
- Harper, A. Breeze (2010b). Sistah Vegan: Black Female Vegans Speak on Food, Identity, Health, and Society. New York: Lantern Books. ISBN 9781590561454.
- Harper, A. Breeze (16 June 2011). "Need for critical race vegan studies? Help Sistah Vegan Project Out". The Sistah Vegan Project. Archived from the original on 7 January 2019.
- Harper, A. Breeze (2012). "Going Beyond the Normative White 'Post-Racial' Vegan Epistemology". In Forson, Psyche Williams; Counihan, Carole (eds.). Taking Food Public: Redefining Foodways in a Changing World. New York and Abingdon: Routledge. pp. 155–174. ISBN 978-0415888547.
- Holdier, A. G. (2016). "Speciesist Veganism: An Anthropocentric Argument". In Castricano, Jodey; Simonsen, Rasmus R. (eds.). Critical Perspectives on Veganism. Basingstoke, England: Palgrave Macmillan. pp. 41–66. ISBN 978-3-319-33418-9.
- Joy, Melanie; Tuider, Jens (2016). "Foreword". In Castricano, Jodey; Simonsen, Rasmus R. (eds.). Critical Perspectives on Veganism. Basingstoke, England: Palgrave Macmillan. pp. v–xv. ISBN 978-3-319-33418-9.
- Kang, Han (2016). The Vegetarian: A Novel. London: Hogarth. ISBN 978-0553448184.
- Kercsmar, Joshua Abram (2017). "Review: The Historical Animal". Journal of American History. 103 (4): 1018–1019. doi:10.1093/jahist/jaw514.
- Larue, Renan (2018a). "Vegan studies". Vegan Studies at UC Santa Barbara. Archived from the original on 15 January 2019.
- Larue, Renan (2018b). "Course description". Vegan Studies at UC Santa Barbara. Archived from the original on 31 December 2018.
- Lockwood, Alex (2019). "H is for Hypocrite: Reading 'New Nature Writing' Through the Lens of Vegan Theory". In Wright, Laura (ed.). Through a Vegan Studies Lens: Textual Ethics and Lived Activism. Reno, NV: University of Nevada Press. pp. 205–222. ISBN 978-1948908108.
- Martinelli, Dario; Berkmanienė, Ausra (12 February 2018). "The Politics and the Demographics of Veganism: Notes for a Critical Analysis". International Journal for the Semiotics of Law. 31 (3): 501–530. doi:10.1007/s11196-018-9543-3. S2CID 149235953.
- Milburn, Josh (2018). "Review: Critical Perspectives on Veganism by Jodey Castricano and Rasmus R. Simonsen". Journal of Animal Ethics. 8 (2): 252–253. doi:10.5406/janimalethics.8.2.0252.
- Quinn, Emilia; Westwood, Ben (2016). "Running an interdisciplinary conference: 'Towards a Vegan Theory'". Torch: The Oxford Research Centre in the Humanities. Archived from the original on 31 December 2018.
- Quinn, Emelia; Westwood, Benjamin (2018). "Acknowledgments; Introduction: Thinking Through Veganism". In Quinn, Emelia; Westwood, Benjamin (eds.). Thinking Veganism in Literature and Culture: Towards a Vegan Theory. Palgrave Studies in Animals and Literature. Cham, Switzerland: Palgrave Macmillan. pp. v, 1–24. ISBN 978-3319733791.
- Pecnik, Katia (17 August 2016). "Les Véganes". Altermonde-sans-frontières. Archived from the original on 18 August 2016.
- Pederson, Helena; Stanescu, Vasile (2014). "Conclusion: Future directions for critical animal studies". In Taylor, Nik; Twine, Richard (eds.). The Rise of Critical Animal Studies: From the Margins to the Centre. Abingdon and New York: Routledge. pp. 262–276. ISBN 978-1138125919.
- Polish, Jennifer (2016). "Decolonizing Veganism: On Resisting Vegan Whiteness and Racism". In Castricano, Jodey; Simonsen, Rasmus R. (eds.). Critical Perspectives on Veganism. Basingstoke, England: Palgrave Macmillan. pp. 373–391. ISBN 978-3-319-33418-9.
- Preece, Rod (2008). Sins of the Flesh: A History of Ethical Vegetarian Thought. Vancouver: University of British Columbia Press. ISBN 978-0774815116.
- Salih, Sara (2018). "Remnants: The Witness and the Animal". In Quinn, Emelia; Westwood, Benjamin (eds.). Thinking Veganism in Literature and Culture: Towards a Vegan Theory. Palgrave Studies in Animals and Literature. Cham, Switzerland: Palgrave Macmillan. pp. 57–73. ISBN 9783319733791.
- Shapiro, Kenneth J. (1 January 1993). "Editor's Introduction to Society and Animals". Society & Animals. 1 (1): 1–4. doi:10.1163/156853093X00091.
- Socha, Kim; Mitchell, Les (2014). "Critical Animal Studies as an Interdisciplinary Field: A Holistic Approach to Confronting Oppression". In Nocella III, Anthony J.; Sorenson, John; Matsuoka, Atsuko; Socha, Kim (eds.). Defining Critical Animal Studies: An Intersectional Social Justice Approach for Liberation. New York: Peter Lang. pp. 110–134. ISBN 978-1433121371.
- Spencer, Colin (1996). The Heretic's Feast: A History of Vegetarianism (1st paperback ed.). Hanover, NH: University Press of New England. ISBN 978-0874517606.
- Stobie, Caitlin E. (2017). "The Good Wife? Sibling Species in Han Kang's The Vegetarian" (PDF). Interdisciplinary Studies in Literature and Environment. 24 (4): 787–802. doi:10.1093/isle/isx073.
- Stuart, Tristam (2006). The Bloodless Revolution: Radical Vegetarianism and the Discovery of India. London: HarperPress. ISBN 978-0007128921.
- Taylor, Nik; Twine, Richard (2014). "Introduction: Locating the 'critical' in critical animal studies". The Rise of Critical Animal Studies: From the Margins to the Centre. Abingdon and New York: Routledge. ISBN 978-0415858571.
- Todd, Megan (2020). "Book Review: Thinking Veganism in Literature and Culture: Towards a Vegan Theory". Journal of Cultural Analysis and Social Change. 5 (1): 7. doi:10.20897/jcasc/8410.
- Twine, Richard (1 February 2018). "Materially Constituting a Sustainable Food Transition: The Case of Vegan Eating Practice". Sociology. 52 (1): 166–181. doi:10.1177/0038038517726647.
- Wright, Laura (2015). The Vegan Studies Project: Food, Animals, and Gender in the Age of Terror. Athens, GA: University of Georgia Press. ISBN 978-0820348544.
- Wright, Laura; Joelle, Natalie; McCorry, Seán; et al. (Autumn 2017). "Special Cluster: Vegan Studies and Ecocriticism". Interdisciplinary Studies in Literature and Environment. 24 (4). Archived from the original on 31 December 2018.
- Wright, Laura (31 December 2017). "Introducing Vegan Studies". Interdisciplinary Studies in Literature and Environment. 24 (4): 727–736. doi:10.1093/isle/isx070.
- Wright, Laura (2018). "Vegans in the Interregnum: The Cultural Moment of an Enmeshed Theory". In Quinn, Emelia; Westwood, Benjamin (eds.). Thinking Veganism in Literature and Culture: Towards a Vegan Theory. Palgrave Studies in Animals and Literature. Cham, Switzerland: Palgrave Macmillan. pp. 1–24. ISBN 978-3319733791.
- Wright, Laura (2019). "Doing Vegan Studies: An Introduction". In Wright, Laura (ed.). Through a Vegan Studies Lens: Textual Ethics and Lived Activism. Reno, NV: University of Nevada Press. pp. vii–xxiv. ISBN 978-1948908108.
- Yarbrough, Anastasia; Thomas, Susan (2010). "Guest Editorial: Women of Color in Critical Animal Studies" (PDF). Journal for Critical Animal Studies. VIII (3): 3–4. ISSN 1948-352X. Archived (PDF) from the original on 3 February 2016.
