= Laura Wright (literary scholar) =

Founder of academic field of vegan studies

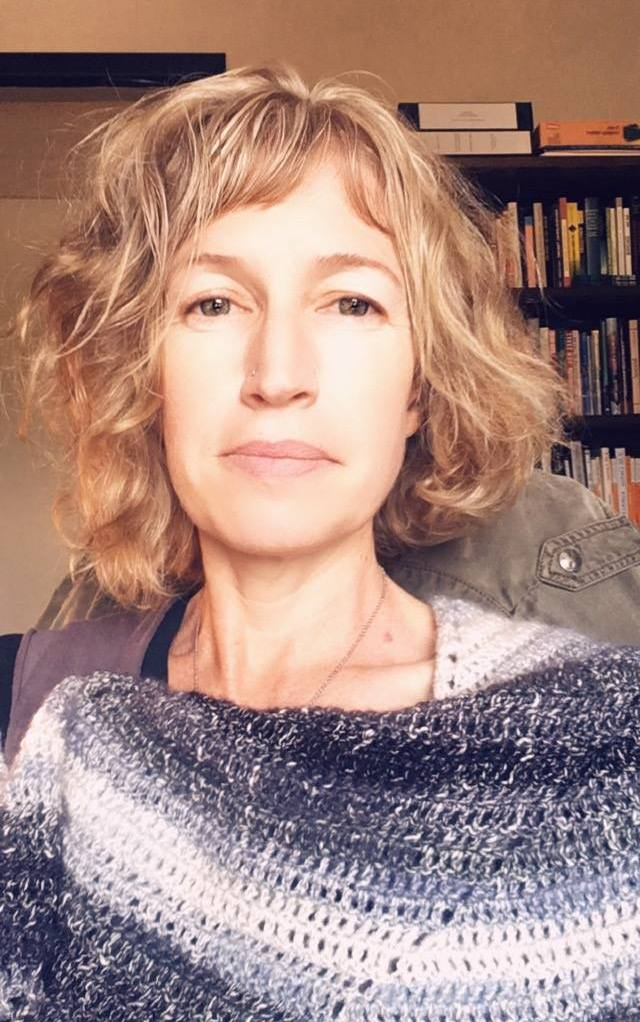
- Occupations: Professor of English, Western Carolina University
- Known for: Founding the academic field of vegan studies

Academic background
- Education: University of Massachusetts Amherst

Academic work
- Discipline: Literature
- Notable works: The Vegan Studies Project: Food, Animals, and Gender in the Age of Terror (2015)

Laura Wright is an American professor of English at Western Carolina University. Wright proposed vegan studies as a new academic field, and her 2015 book The Vegan Studies Project: Food, Animals, and Gender in the Age of Terror served as the foundational text of the discipline. As of 2021 she had edited two collections of articles about vegan studies.

== Education ==
Wright received a bachelor's in English from Appalachian State University in 1992, an MA in English from East Carolina University in 1995, and a PhD in Postcolonial Literature and World Literature from the University of Massachusetts Amherst in 2004.

== Academic interests ==
In addition to vegan studies, Wright's academic and research interests include postcolonial literature and theory, South African literature, ecocriticism, animal studies, and food studies.

== Impact ==
Wright's 2015 book The Vegan Studies Project: Food, Animals, and Gender in the Age of Terror which proposed the academic field "vegan studies," served as the foundational text for and introduced the discipline. She has since edited two collections of vegan studies articles, including Through a Vegan Studies Lens: Textual Ethics and Lived Activism (2019) and The Routledge Handbook of Vegan Studies (2021).

Reviewers and academics called the book a "foundational work" and "the foundational text for the nascent field" of vegan studies. In her foreword to the book, Carol J. Adams says, "Thanks to this work, we now have a new category: the vegan studies-loving vegan." Cristina Hanganu-Bresch and Kristin Kondrlik, in their introduction to Veg(etari)an Arguments in Culture, History, and Practice: The V Word, said Wright's proposal had framed vegan studies as a "critical lens to be applied to other cultural artifacts, and, indeed, to a whole new theory of culture." Kathryn Dolan said in the journal Interdisciplinary Studies in Literature and Environment that it "will clearly become an area of further study." Jodey Castricano and Rasmus R. Simonsen called it "the first vegan studies monograph to be published by a university press."

Dario Martinelli and Ausra Berkmaniene said, "The presence and legitimacy of 'vegan studies' within the academic world, especially since Wright cared to formalize the expression and define a paradigm, is something that should no longer require an explanation or a justification," and that she "coined the expression". Emelia Quinn and Benjamin Westwood called the book, "the first major academic monograph" on veganism and the humanities.

Marianna Koljonnen in 2019 called Wright "the founder of vegan studies". Marzena Kubisz, also writing in 2019, called The Vegan Studies Project "the monograph which creates the foundations for vegan studies".

Wright has given several talks to academic conferences about the introduction of vegan studies, including keynote addresses at Towards A Vegan Theory: An Interdisciplinary Humanities Conference at Oxford University, Animal Politics: Justice, Power, and the State at Internationale School voor Wijsbegeerte, and a lecture, The Dangerous Vegan: The Politics of Scholarship, Identity and Consumption in the Anthropocene, at Appalachian State.

Appalachian State University offered a fall 2019 Honors Seminar, What is Vegan Studies? Exploring an Emerging Field, saying that with The Vegan Studies Project's publication "a powerful transdisciplinary field has emerged which is in turn influencing work across the disciplines" and Wright's works the field's "founding texts".

== Awards and honors ==
- University of North Carolina Board of Governors Award for Excellence in Teaching (2018)
- National Humanities Center Fellowship (2012)
- Modern Language Association Florence Howe Award for Feminist Scholarship (2008)

== Bibliography ==
- (2023) with Jessica Cory, eds. Appalachian Ecocriticism and the Paradox of Place. Athens: University of Georgia Press.
- (2022) with Emelia Quinn, eds. The Edinburgh Companion to Vegan Literary Studies. Edinburgh: Edinburgh University Press.
- (2021) ed. The Routledge Handbook of Vegan Studies. London: Routledge.
- (2019) ed. Through a Vegan Studies Lens: Textual Ethics and Lived Activism. Reno: University of Nevada Press.
- (2015) The Vegan Studies Project: Food, Animals, and Gender in the Age of Terror. Athens: University of Georgia Press.
- (2014) with Jane Poyner and Elleke Boehmer, eds. Approaches to Teaching Coetzee's Disgrace and Other Works. New York: The Modern Language Association of America.
- (2013) with Elizabeth Heffelfinger. Visual Difference: Postcolonial Studies and Intercultural Cinema. New York: Peter Lang.
- (2010) Wilderness into Civilized Shapes: Reading the Postcolonial Environment. Athens: University of Georgia Press.
- (2006) Writing Out of All the Camps: J. M. Coetzee's Narratives of Displacement. New York: Routledge.
