= Beyond God the Father =

1973 book by Mary Daly

Beyond God the Father: Toward a Philosophy of Women's Liberation
- 1985 Book cover
- Author: Mary Daly
- Subject: Christian doctrine, Feminism, Feminist theology, Women in Christianity
- Published: 1973
- Publisher: Beacon Press
- Publication place: United States
- Media type: Print, E-book
- Pages: 264
- ISBN: 9780807015025 9780807015032
- OCLC: 4203151
- Dewey Decimal: 301.412
- LC Class: HQ1154 .D3
- Website: Official website

Beyond God the Father: Toward a Philosophy of Women's Liberation by Mary Daly, is a nonfiction book that challenges the patriarchal views promoted by mainstream religious theology. It was originally published by Beacon Press in 1973.

== Synopsis ==
One of Mary Daly's main themes in this book is that religious traditions are based on patriarchy and hence, these traditions oppress women. She also says that the concept of God as male and as "The Father" is supported by male dominance and that this subordinates women. She discusses how religious language and its imagery maintains this power imbalance. Hence, she proposes a breaking away from traditional religions, including Christianity, which she says is misogynistic.

=== Feminist theology ===
Beyond God the Father is the last book in which Daly really considers God a substantive subject. She laid out her systematic theology, following Paul Tillich's example. Often regarded as a foundational work in feminist theology, Beyond God the Father is her attempt to explain and overcome androcentrism in Western religion, and it is notable for its playful writing style and its attempt to rehabilitate "God-talk" for the women's liberation movement by critically building on the writing of existentialist theologians such as Paul Tillich and Martin Buber. While the former increasingly characterized her writing, she soon abandoned the latter.

== Book organization ==
The book is organized by an Introduction to the text, followed by seven chapters, then Notes for the chapters and a subject index.

Introduction: The Problem, the Purpose, and the Method

1. After the Death of God the Father
2. Exorcising Evil from Eve: the Fall into Freedom
3. Beyond Christolatry: a World Without Models
4. Transvaluation of Values: the End of Phallic Morality
5. The Bonds of Freedom: Sisterhood as Antichurch
6. Sisterhood as Cosmic Covenant
7. The Final Cause: the Cause of Causes

Notes
Index
