= The Sexual Politics of Meat =

1990 book by Carol J. Adams

The Sexual Politics of Meat: A Feminist-Vegetarian Critical Theory
- Cover of the first edition
- Author: Carol J. Adams
- Language: English
- Publisher: Continuum
- Publication date: 1990
- Publication place: United States
- Media type: Print

The Sexual Politics of Meat: A Feminist-Vegetarian Critical Theory is a 1990 book by American author and activist Carol J. Adams published by Continuum. The book was first written as an essay for a college course taught by Mary Daly and includes material such as interviews from vegetarian feminists in the Boston–Cambridge area. The Sexual Politics of Meat has been translated into nine languages and re-published for its 25th anniversary edition as a part of the Bloomsbury Revelations series.

== Reception ==
The Sexual Politics of Meat has been reviewed by multiple outlets, which includes the NWSA Journal, Etnofoor, and The Women's Review of Books. Writing in 2010 on a 20th-anniversary reissue in The Guardian, Nina Power commented that The Sexual Politics of Meat was "still as relevant as ever".

== See also ==
- List of vegan and plant-based media
