= Virginia Messina =

American dietitian and veganism activist

- Born: Virginia Kisch
- Education: University of Michigan (MPH, 1981)
- Occupations: Activist; author; dietitian

Virginia Messina (also known as Ginny Messina and The Vegan RD) is an American registered dietitian and veganism activist, best known for her research on plant-based nutrition. She has twice co-authored the Academy of Nutrition and Dietetics position paper on vegetarian diets.

== Career ==
Messina became a vegetarian in 1970s after reading the cookbook Laurel's Kitchen. She became interested in animal rights and veganism in the 1980s. She obtained a bachelor's degree in home economics from Douglass College and a Master of Public Health degree in human nutrition from the University of Michigan School of Public Health in 1981. She was director of nutrition services at George Washington University Medical Center from 1987 to 1989 and a dietitian for the Physicians Committee for Responsible Medicine (PCRM) from 1989 to 1992. She was on the PCRM Board of Advisors from 1997 to 2012. Messina is an adjunct assistant professor at Loma Linda University.

Messina is a member of the Vegetarian Resource Group and has been on their board of advisors since 1997. Messina and her husband founded Vegetarian Nutrition: An International Journal. She is a founding member of the Academy of Nutrition and Dietetics Vegetarian Nutrition Dietetic Practice Group. Messina co-authored the Academy of Nutrition and Dietetics (formerly American Dietetic Association) position paper on vegetarian diets in 1997 and 2003.

In 2011, Messina co-authored Vegan for Life: Everything You Need to Know to Be Healthy on a Plant-Based Diet with Jack Norris. It was updated in 2020.

In 2018, Messina was a speaker at the Boston Veg Food Fest.

== Personal life ==
Messina is married to Mark J. Messina, a nutritionist and soy researcher. They reside in the Berkshires of western Massachusetts. She is an animal rights activist and vegan who volunteers with Berkshire Voters for Animals. Messina serves on the board of directors of Alley Cat Rescue.

Her father William Joseph Kisch died in 2003.

== Selected publications ==
- The Vegetarian Way: Total Health for You and Your Family (with Mark Messina, 1996)
- Position of the American Dietetic Association and Dietitians of Canada: Vegetarian diets (2003)
- The Dietitian's Guide to Vegetarian Diets: Issues and Applications (with Reed Mangels, 2010)
- Vegan for Her: The Woman's Guide to Being Healthy and Fit on a Plant-Based Diet (2013)
- Never Too Late To Go Vegan (2014, with Carol J. Adams)
- Vegan for Life: Everything You Need to Know to Be Healthy on a Plant-Based Diet (with Jack Norris, 2020)
- Nova Fails to Appreciate the Value of Plant-Based Meat and Dairy Alternatives in the Diet (with Mark Messina, 2024)
