= Mary Daly =

American feminist philosopher and theologian (1928–2010)

- Daly c. 1969
- Born: October 16, 1928; Schenectady, New York, US
- Died: January 3, 2010 (aged 81); Gardner, Massachusetts, US

Academic background
- Education: College of Saint Rose; Catholic University of America; Saint Mary's College; University of Fribourg
- Influences: Virginia Woolf; Matilda Joslyn Gage; Paul Tillich; Martin Buber; Simone de Beauvoir; Thomas Aquinas

Academic work
- Discipline: Philosophy; theology
- School or tradition: Radical feminism
- Institutions: Boston College
- Doctoral students: Janice Raymond
- Main interests: Feminist theology; feminist philosophy; ontology; metaphysics
- Notable works: Beyond God the Father (1973); Gyn/Ecology (1978)
- Influenced: Pauli Murray; Janice Raymond; Carol J. Adams

Mary Daly (October 16, 1928 – January 3, 2010) was an American radical feminist philosopher and theologian. Daly, who described herself as a "radical lesbian feminist", taught at the Jesuit-run Boston College for 33 years. Once a practicing Catholic, she disavowed Christianity by the early 1970s. Daly was fired from Boston College in 1999, after violating university policy by refusing to allow male students in her advanced women's studies classes.

== Early life and education ==
Mary Daly was born in Schenectady, New York, on October 16, 1928. She was an only child. Her mother was a homemaker and her father, a traveling salesman. Daly was raised in a Catholic environment; both her parents were Irish Catholics and Daly attended Catholic schools as a girl. Early in her childhood, Daly had mystical experiences which she later described as her feeling the presence of divinity in nature.

Daly received her Bachelor of Arts degree in English from the College of Saint Rose in 1950, and a Master of Arts degree in English from the Catholic University of America. She earned a PhD in religion from Saint Mary's College in 1953.

She later earned two additional doctorates in sacred theology and philosophy from the University of Fribourg, Switzerland.

== Career ==
Daly taught classes at Boston College from 1967 to 1999, including courses in theology, feminist ethics, and patriarchy.

Daly was first threatened with dismissal when, following the publication of her first book, The Church and the Second Sex (1968), she was issued a terminal (fixed-length) contract. As a result of support from the (then all-male) student body and the general public, however, Daly was ultimately granted tenure.

Daly's refusal to admit male students to some of her classes at Boston College also resulted in disciplinary action. While Daly argued that their presence inhibited class discussion, Boston College took the view that her actions were in violation of title IX of federal law requiring the college to ensure that no person was excluded from an education program on the basis of sex, and of the university's own non-discrimination policy insisting that all courses be open to both male and female students. Daly allowed male students in her introductory class and privately tutored those who wanted to take advanced classes.

In 1989, Daly became an associate of the Women's Institute for Freedom of the Press.

In 1998, a discrimination claim against the college by two male students was backed by the Center for Individual Rights, a libertarian advocacy group. Following further reprimand, Daly absented herself from classes rather than admit the male students. Boston College removed her tenure rights, citing a verbal agreement by Daly to retire. She brought suit against the college disputing violation of her tenure rights and claimed she was forced out against her will, but her request for an injunction was denied by Middlesex Superior Court Judge Martha Sosman.

A confidential out-of-court settlement was reached. The college maintains that Daly had agreed to retire from her faculty position, while others assert she was forced out. Daly maintained that Boston College wronged her students by depriving her of her right to teach freely to only female students. She documented her account of the events in the 2006 book, Amazon Grace: Recalling the Courage to Sin Big.

Daly protested the commencement speech of Condoleezza Rice at Boston College, and she spoke on campuses around the United States as well as internationally.

Daly died on January 3, 2010, in Gardner, Massachusetts.

== Works ==
Daly published a number of works, and is perhaps best known for her second book, Beyond God the Father (1973). Beyond God the Father is the last book in which Daly really considers God a substantive subject. She laid out her systematic theology, following Paul Tillich's example. Often regarded as a foundational work in feminist theology, Beyond God the Father is her attempt to explain and overcome androcentrism in Western religion, and it is notable for its playful writing style and its attempt to rehabilitate "God-talk" for the women's liberation movement by critically building on the writing of existentialist theologians such as Paul Tillich and Martin Buber. While the former increasingly characterized her writing, she soon abandoned the latter.

In Gyn/Ecology: The Metaethics of Radical Feminism (1978), Daly argues that men throughout history have sought to oppress women. In this book she moves beyond her previous thoughts on the history of patriarchy to the focus on the actual practices that, in her view, perpetuate patriarchy, which she calls a religion.

Daly's Pure Lust: Elemental Feminist Philosophy (1984) and Websters' First New Intergalactic Wickedary of the English Language (1987) introduce and explore an alternative language to explain the process of exorcism and ecstasy. In Wickedary Daly provides definitions as well as chants that she says can be used by women to free themselves from patriarchal oppression. She also explores the labels that she says patriarchal society places on women to prolong what she sees as male domination of society. Daly said it is the role of women to unveil the liberatory nature of labels such as "Hag", "Witch", and "Lunatic".

Daly's work continues to influence feminism and feminist theology, as well as the developing concept of biophilia as an alternative and challenge to social necrophilia. She was an ethical vegetarian and animal rights activist. Gyn/Ecology, Pure Lust, and Websters' First New Intergalactic Wickedary all endorse anti-vivisection and anti-fur positions. Daly was a member of the advisory board of Feminists For Animal Rights, a group which is now defunct.

Daly created her own theological anthropology based around the context of what it means to be a woman. She created a thought-praxis that separates the world into the world of false images that create oppression and the world of communion in true being. She labeled these two areas foreground and Background respectively. Daly considered the foreground the realm of patriarchy and the Background the realm of Woman. She argued that the Background is under and behind the surface of the false reality of the foreground. The foreground, for Daly, was a distortion of true being, the paternalistic society in which she said most people live. It has no real energy, but drains the "life energy" of women residing in the Background. In her view, the foreground creates a world of poisons that contaminate natural life. She called the male-centered world of the foreground necrophilic, hating all living things. In contrast, she conceived of the Background as a place where all living things connect.

=== Gyn/Ecology ===
Daly linked "female energy" or her term gyn/ecology to the essential life-creating condition of the female spirit/body.

According to Lucy Sargisson, "Daly seeks in Gyn/Ecology (1987) a true, wild, Woman's self, which she perceives to be dormant in women, temporarily pacified by patriarchal systems of domination."

Audre Lorde expressed concern over Gyn/Ecology in an open letter, citing homogenizing tendencies, and a refusal to acknowledge the "herstory and myth" of women of color. The letter, and Daly's apparent decision not to publicly respond, greatly affected the reception of Daly's work among other feminist theorists, and has been described as a "paradigmatic example of challenges to white feminist theory by feminists of color in the 1980s."

Daly's reply letter to Lorde, dated four and a half months later, was found in 2003 in Lorde's files after she died. Daly's reply was followed in a week by a meeting with Lorde at which Daly said, among other things, that Gyn/Ecology was not a compendium of goddesses but limited to "those goddess myths and symbols that were direct sources of Christian myth," but whether this was accepted by Lorde was unknown at the time.

=== Papers ===
After her death, Daly's papers were contributed to the Sophia Smith Collection of Women's History at Smith College.

== Perspectives on Daly's work ==
Although Daly described herself as a radical feminist, other theorists such as Alice Echols, Linda Alcoff and Elizabeth V. Spelman situated her thinking in cultural feminism, of which premises are called by Ellen Willis “antithetical” to those of radical feminism.

Julie Kubala states that Gyn/Ecology’s “essentialist conception of gender is explicitly transphobic and implicitly racist.”

Wanda Warren Berry, Purushottama Bilimoria, Debra Campbell, Molly Dragiewicz, Marilyn Frye, Frances Gray, Hayes Hampton, Sarah Lucia Hoagland, Amber L. Katherine, AnaLouise Keating, Anne-Marrie Korte, Maria Lugones, Geraldine Moane, Sheilagh A. Mogford, Renuka Sharma, Laurel C. Schneider, and Marja Suhonen published their considered analyses of Daly's works and philosophy in Feminist Interpretations of Mary Daly, Penn State University Press, 2000.

== Views ==
=== On religion ===
At the beginning of her career, Daly had been a practicing Catholic.

In The Church and the Second Sex, Daly argued that religion and equality between women and men are not mutually exclusive. In her early works she sought to change religion and create an equal place for women in Catholicism by calling the church out on injustice and insisting on change. In the course of her writings her view of religion changed. She repudiated the Christian faith and regarded organized religion as inherently oppressive toward women by the time she wrote Beyond God and Father, stating that "woman's asking for equality in the church would be comparable to a black person's demanding equality in the Ku Klux Klan". In 1975, she characterized herself as a "post-Christian feminist".

Daly believed God to be an anti-feminist way of thinking. "If God is male then the male is God. How can a feminist worship a male God? The unholy trinity of rape, genocide and war are a result of the patriarchal society".

Daly eventually gave up on theology, believing it to be hopelessly patriarchal, and she turned her efforts towards philosophical feminism. She saw the Catholic Church as fundamentally corrupt, but it still had some value to her, as was evidenced by her love for her copy of Summa Theologica in her later days. Despite her abandonment of the subject, Daly's work opened the door for many more feminist theologians after her. Even when she moved on from the study of religion her ideas remained and inspired many of her contemporaries.

Daly's subsequent work was influenced by Wicca, though she rejected the characterization of her theology as being "Wiccan".

=== On feminism ===
In Gyn/Ecology (1978), she criticized the "Equal Rights" feminist framework. Many feminist thinkers consider the choice to use an "equality" lens (also known as an "equity" or "equality" framework) a distinctive mark of politically liberal, rather than politically radical or postmodern, feminisms. Daly's argument was that the equality framework serves to distract women from the radical goal of altering or abolishing patriarchy as a whole, directing them instead towards gaining reforms within the existing system. According to Daly, such reforms leave women vulnerable because, though they grant nominal legal equality with men, the larger structures of patriarchy are left intact, and the later repeal of reforms is always possible. She also argued that the "equality" framework de-centers women from feminist thought when it encourages women to assimilate into male-dominated movements or institutions.

=== On men ===
In The Church and the Second Sex, Daly argued for the equality between the sexes and stated that the church must acknowledge the importance of equality between men and women. She wrote that women and men were created equal.

In Gyn/Ecology (1978), Daly claimed that male culture was the direct, evil opposite of female nature, and that the ultimate purpose of men was death of both women and nature. Daly contrasted women's life-giving powers with men's death-dealing powers.

In Beyond God the Father (1973), she still believed that equality was important but argued more in terms of sexual difference than sexual equality.

In a 1999 interview with What Is Enlightenment? magazine, Daly said, "I don't think about men. I really don't care about them. I'm concerned with women's capacities, which have been infinitely diminished under patriarchy. Not that they've disappeared, but they've been made subliminal. I'm concerned with women enlarging our capacities, actualizing them. So that takes all my energy."

Later in the interview when asked about her opinion on Sally Miller Gearhart's proposal that "the proportion of men must be reduced to and maintained at approximately 10% of the human race", she said, "I think it's not a bad idea at all. If life is to survive on this planet, there must be a decontamination of the Earth. I think this will be accompanied by an evolutionary process that will result in a drastic reduction of the population of males."

=== On transgender persons ===
In Gyn/Ecology, Daly asserted her view of transgender persons, writing, "Today the Frankenstein phenomenon is omnipresent ... in ... phallocratic technology ... Transsexualism is an example of male surgical siring which invades the female world with substitutes." "Transsexualism, which Janice Raymond has shown to be essentially a male problem, is an attempt to change males into females, whereas in fact no male can assume female chromosomes and life history/experience." "The surgeons and hormone therapists of the transsexual kingdom ... can be said to produce feminine persons. They cannot produce women."

Daly was the dissertation advisor to Janice Raymond, whose dissertation was published in 1979 as The Transsexual Empire.

== Bibliography ==
=== Books ===
- — (1968). The Church and the second sex. New York: Harper & Row. OCLC 193755.
- — (1973). Beyond God the Father: Toward a Philosophy of Women's Liberation. Boston: Beacon Press. ISBN 978-0-8070-4164-2.
- — (1978). Gyn/ecology: The metaethics of radical feminism. Boston: Beacon Press. ISBN 0-8070-1510-5.
- — (1984). Pure Lust: Elemental Feminist Philosophy. Boston: Beacon Press. ISBN 0-8070-1504-0.
- with Caputi, Jane (1987). Websters' First New Intergalactic Wickedary of the English Language. Boston: Beacon Press. ISBN 0-8070-6706-7.
- — (1992). Outercourse: The bedazzling voyage, containing recollections from my logbook of a radical feminist philosopher. San Francisco: Harper San Francisco. ISBN 0-06-250194-1.
- — (1998). Quintessence: Realizing the archaic future: A radical elemental feminist manifesto. Boston: Beacon Press. ISBN 0-8070-6790-3.
- — (2006). Amazon Grace: Re-calling the courage to sin big (1st ed.). New York: Palgrave MacMillan. ISBN 1-4039-6853-5.

=== Articles ===
- Daly, Mary (1971). "The Spiritual Dimension of Women's Liberation". In Koedt, Anne (ed.). Notes from the Third Year: Women's Liberation. Notes from the Second Year, Inc. pp. 75–79. Republished in Koedt, Anne; Levine, E.; Rapone, A., eds. (1973). Radical Feminism. New York: Quadrangle Books. pp. 259–267. ISBN 978-0-8129-0316-4.
- Daly, Mary (October 1978). "Prelude to the first passage". Feminist Studies. 4 (3): 81–86. doi:10.2307/3177539. JSTOR 3177539. Text is from Gyn/Ecology (book), at the time not yet published.
- Daly, Mary (February 26, 1996). "Sin big". The New Yorker. pp. 76–84.
- Daly, Mary (1990). "Spiraling Into the Nineties". Woman of Power. No. 17. pp. 6–12.
- Daly, Mary (November 12, 1990). "New Intergalactic Introduction". Gyn/Ecology: The Metaethics of Radical Feminism (2nd ed.). Boston: Beacon Press. pp. xiii–xxxv. ISBN 978-0-8070-1413-4.
- Daly, Mary (1989). "Be-Friending: Weaving Contexts, Creating Atmospheres". In Plaskow, Judith; Christ, Carol P. (eds.). Weaving the Visions: New Patterns in Feminist Spirituality. San Francisco: Harper and Row. pp. 199–207. ISBN 978-0-06-061383-9.
- Daly, Mary (Winter 1988). "Be-Laughing". Woman of Power. No. 8. pp. 76–80.
- Daly, Mary (1985). "New Archaic Afterwords". The Church and the Second Sex. Boston: Beacon Press. pp. xi–xxx. ISBN 978-0-8070-1101-0.
- Daly, Mary (1985). "Original Reintroduction". Beyond God the Father: Toward a Philosophy of Women's Liberation. Boston: Beacon Press. pp. xi–xxix. ISBN 978-0-8070-1503-2.
- Daly, Mary (1982). "Gyn/Ecology: Spinning New Time/Space". In Spretnak, Charlene (ed.). The Politics of Women's Spirituality: Essays on the Rise of Spiritual Power Within the Feminist Movement. Anchor Books. pp. 207–212. ISBN 978-0-385-17770-2.
- Daly, Mary (1977). "Radical feminism, radical religion". In Clark, Elizabeth Ann; Richardson, Herbert Warren (eds.). Women and religion: A feminist sourcebook of Christian thought. Harper Forum. Harper & Row. pp. 259–271. ISBN 978-0-06-061398-3.
- Daly, Mary (1977). "The courage to leave: A response to John Cobb's theology". In Griffin, D. R.; Altizer, T. J. J. (eds.). John Cobb's theology in process. Westminster Press. ISBN 978-0-664-21292-6.
- Daly, Mary (1975). "A short essay on hearing and the qualitative leap of radical feminism". Horizons. Vol. 2. pp. 120–124.
- Daly, Mary (Spring 1975). "The qualitative leap beyond patriarchal religion". Quest. Vol. 1. pp. 20–40.
- Daly, Mary (1975). "Autobiographical preface to the Colophon Edition". The Church and the Second Sex. Harper Colophon Books. New York: Harper & Row. pp. 5–14. ISBN 978-0-06-061375-4. Republished as "Autobiographical preface to the 1975 edition". The Church and the Second Sex. Boston: Beacon Press. 1985. pp. 5–14. ISBN 978-0-8070-1101-0.
- Daly, Mary (1985). "Feminist Postchristian Introduction". The Church and the Second Sex. Boston: Beacon Press. pp. 15–51. ISBN 978-0-8070-1101-0.
- Daly, Mary (December 1974). "God Is a Verb". Ms. pp. 58–62, 96–98.
- Daly, Mary (1973). "Post-Christian Theology". In Romero, Joan Arnold (ed.). Women and Religion: Proceedings of the Working Group on Women and Religion. American Academy of Religion / Scholars Press. pp. 33–38. ISBN 978-0-88420-107-6.
- Daly, Mary (Autumn 1972). "A Call for the Castration of Sexist Religion". The Unitarian Universalist Christian. Vol. 27. pp. 23–37.
- Daly, Mary (September 1972). "The Women's Movement: An Exodus Community". Religious Education. Vol. 67. pp. 327–335.
- Daly, Mary (1972). "The Spiritual Revolution: Women's Liberation as Theological Re-education". Notre Dame Journal of Education. Vol. 2. pp. 300–312.
- Daly, Mary (February 4, 1972). "Abortion and Sexual Caste". Commonweal. No. 95. pp. 415–419.
- Daly, Mary (March 12, 1971). "After the Death of God the Father: Women's Liberation and the Transformation of Christian Consciousness". Commonweal. pp. 7–11.
- Daly, Mary (September 22, 1971). "The Courage to See". Christian Century. Vol. 88. pp. 1108–1111.
- Daly, Mary (1970). "Toward Partnership in the Church". In Thompson, Mary Lou (ed.). Voices of the New Feminism. Boston: Beacon Press. pp. 136–151. ISBN 978-0-8070-4174-1.
- Daly, Mary (1970). "Women and the Catholic Church". In Morgan, Robin (ed.). Sisterhood is Powerful: An anthology of writings from the women's liberation movement. New York: Vintage Books. pp. 137–153. ISBN 978-0-394-70539-2.
- Daly, Mary (June 26, 1970). "The Problem of Hope". Commonweal. No. 92. pp. 314–317.
- Daly, Mary (November 14, 1969). "Mary Daly and the Church". Commonweal. No. 91. p. 215.
- Daly, Mary (June 6, 1969). "Return of the Protestant Principle". Commonweal. No. 90. pp. 338–341.
- Daly, Mary (August 9, 1968). "Underground Theology". Commonweal. No. 88. pp. 532–534.
- Daly, Mary (May 31, 1968). "Dispensing with Trivia". Commonweal. No. 88. pp. 322–325.
- Daly, Mary (1968). "Christian Mission After the Death of God". In Wilson, William Joseph (ed.). Demands for Christian Renewal. Maryknoll Publications. pp. 1–18.
- Daly, Mary (1968). "Hans Kung". In Boney, William J.; Molumby, Lawrence E. (eds.). The New Day: Catholic Theologians of the Renewal. Richmond: John Knox Press. pp. 129–142.
- Daly, Mary (1968). "Antifeminism in the Church". Information Documentation on the Conciliar Church. No. 68–44.
- Daly, Mary (June 2, 1967). "Zeroing in on Freedom". Commonweal. No. 86. pp. 316–317.
- Daly, Mary (1965). "The Problem of Speculative Theology". The Thomist. Vol. 29. pp. 177–216.
- Daly, Mary (1964). "Women and the Church". Commonweal. No. 79. p. 603.

=== Theses/dissertations ===
- Natural Knowledge of God in the Philosophy of Jacques Maritain. Officium Libri Catholici, 1966. OCLC 2219525
- The Problem of Speculative Theology. Thomist Press. 1965. OCLC (4 records)

=== Translations ===
Mary Daly's book, The Church and the Second Sex, was translated by Helen Hye-Sook Hwang into Korean and published by Women's News Press in 1997.

Mary Daly's book, Beyond God the Father: Toward a Philosophy of Women's Liberation, was translated by Helen Hye-Sook Hwang into Korean and published by Ewha Women's University in 1996.
