= Emelia Quinn =

British literary scholar (born 1992)

Interviews
- Knowing Animals Episode 153: Emelia Quinn on Vegan Camp
- Knowing Animals Episode 185: The Monstrous Vegan with Emelia Quinn

Emelia Quinn (born 1992) is a British scholar of English known for her work developing vegan theory. She is an assistant professor at the University of Ottawa.

== Career ==
Quinn studied for a BA in Film and Literature at the University of Warwick, graduating in 2013. She then went on to study for an MA in Culture and Thought after 1945 at the University of York, which she completed in 2014. It was at York that she was introduced to animal studies by Jason Edwards. She went on to read for a DPhil at the University of Oxford. Her thesis, which was submitted in 2019, was entitled The monstrous vegan: reading veganism in literature, 1818 to present. The thesis was supervised by Ankhi Mukherjee, and examined by Anat Pick and Sophie Ratcliffe. While at Oxford, Quinn co-edited, with Cassie Westwood, the collection Thinking Veganism in Literature and Culture: Towards a Vegan Theory. This was published in 2018 by Palgrave Macmillan as part of their Palgrave Studies in Animals and Literature series.

Quinn briefly taught art history at the University of Birmingham before joining the University of Amsterdam (UvA) as a Lecturer in English in 2019. In 2021, she became an assistant professor of world literatures and environmental humanities at UvA. In the same year, she published the monograph Reading Veganism: The Monstrous Vegan, 1818 to Present with Oxford University Press's Oxford English Monographs series. This book was based on Quinn's doctoral thesis. In 2021, Quinn an became editor of the Oxford University Press and English Association journal The Year's Work in Cultural and Critical Theory, and, in 2022, Edinburgh University Press published The Edinburgh Companion to Vegan Literary Studies, which Quinn co-edited with Laura Wright. In 2024, she moved to the Department of English at the University of Ottawa.

== Research ==
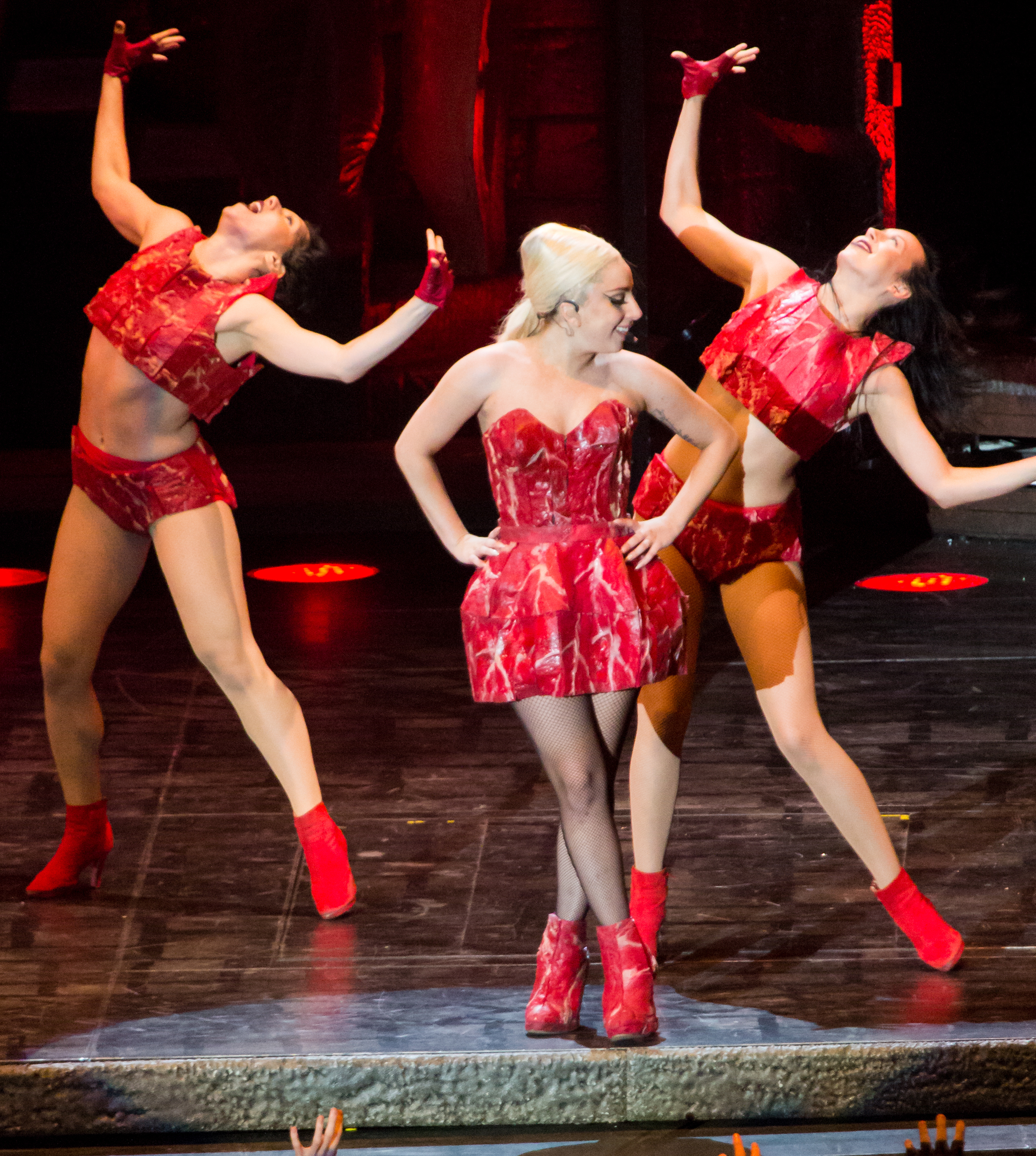
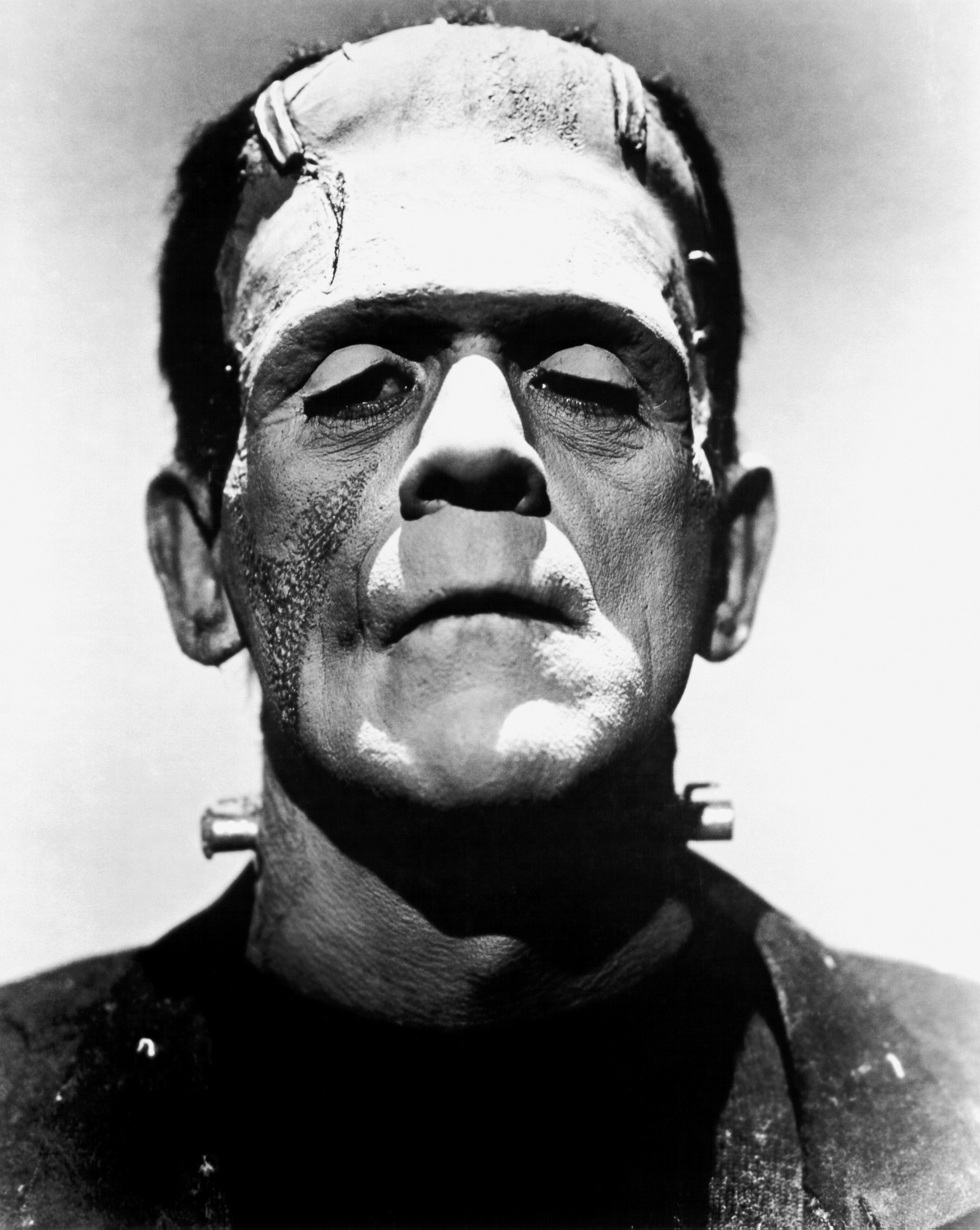
Lady Gaga performs in an imitation of her meat dress, which Quinn characterizes as an example of the "vegan camp" aesthetic, and Boris Karloff as Frankenstein's monster, a character who is the origin, Quinn argues, of the "monstrous vegan" trope.

=== Vegan camp ===
Drawing upon queer theory, especially Susan Sontag's essay "Notes on 'Camp'", Quinn argues for a vegan form of the camp aesthetic that she calls "vegan camp". She defines this as

an aesthetic lens and sensibility that, while acknowledging the extremity of animal suffering, seeks to draw sustenance from what has previously only caused pain. It ... offers a riposte to the unprecedented scale of animal death and the lived experience of late capitalism in which political resistance feels futile. In drawing pleasure from a state of mass violence, vegan camp provides sustenance for individual vegans while refusing a damaging sense of the vegan as a morally righteous "beautiful soul." ... A camp sensibility performs the inescapable complicity of vegan lives in mass suffering. This performance of complicity ... provides a way of working through horror and continuing to fight for change in the face of the seeming impossibility of living an ethical life. In this sense, complicity affords a temporary mode of ethical affiliation, a way of occupying the present that acknowledges rather than castigates feelings of failure and insufficiency.

Examples of the vegan camp aesthetic identified by Quinn include a work of scrimshaw in the Hull Maritime Museum's Turner and the Whale exhibition, Lady Gaga's meat dress, and certain mock meats.

=== Monstrous veganism ===
Reading Veganism introduces the "monstrous vegan". Quinn identifies four traits of the monstrous vegan:

First, monstrous vegans do not eat animals, an abstinence that generates a seemingly inexplicable anxiety in those who encounter them. Second, they are hybrid assemblages of human and nonhuman parts, destabilizing species boundaries. Third, monstrous vegans are sired outside of heterosexual reproduction, the product of male acts of creation. And, finally, monstrous vegans are intimately connected to acts of writing and literary creation.

The trope of the monstrous vegan begins, Quinn argues in Reading Veganism, with the creature created by Victor Frankenstein in Mary Shelley's 1818 novel Frankenstein; or, The Modern Prometheus. She further identifies monstrous vegans in the work of H. G. Wells (including The Island of Doctor Moreau and The Time Machine), Margaret Atwood (including the MaddAddam trilogy), J. M. Coetzee (specifically the character Elizabeth Costello of the eponymous novel and The Lives of Animals), and Alan Hollinghurst (in The Swimming-Pool Library and The Sparsholt Affair).

== Selected works ==
- Quinn, Emelia, and Benjamin Westwood (2018). Thinking Veganism in Literature and Culture: Towards a Vegan Theory. Basingstoke: Palgrave Macmillan.
- Quinn, Emelia (2019). Reading Veganism: The Monstrous Vegan, 1818 to Present. Oxford: Oxford University Press.
- Quinn, Emelia (2020). "Notes on Vegan Camp". PMLA. 135 (5): 914–930. doi:10.1632/pmla.2020.135.5.914. S2CID 233316079.
- Wright, Laura, and Emelia Quinn, eds. (2022). The Edinburgh Companion to Vegan Literary Studies. Edinburgh: Edinburgh University Press.
