= Renan Larue =

French writer, literary scholar and historian

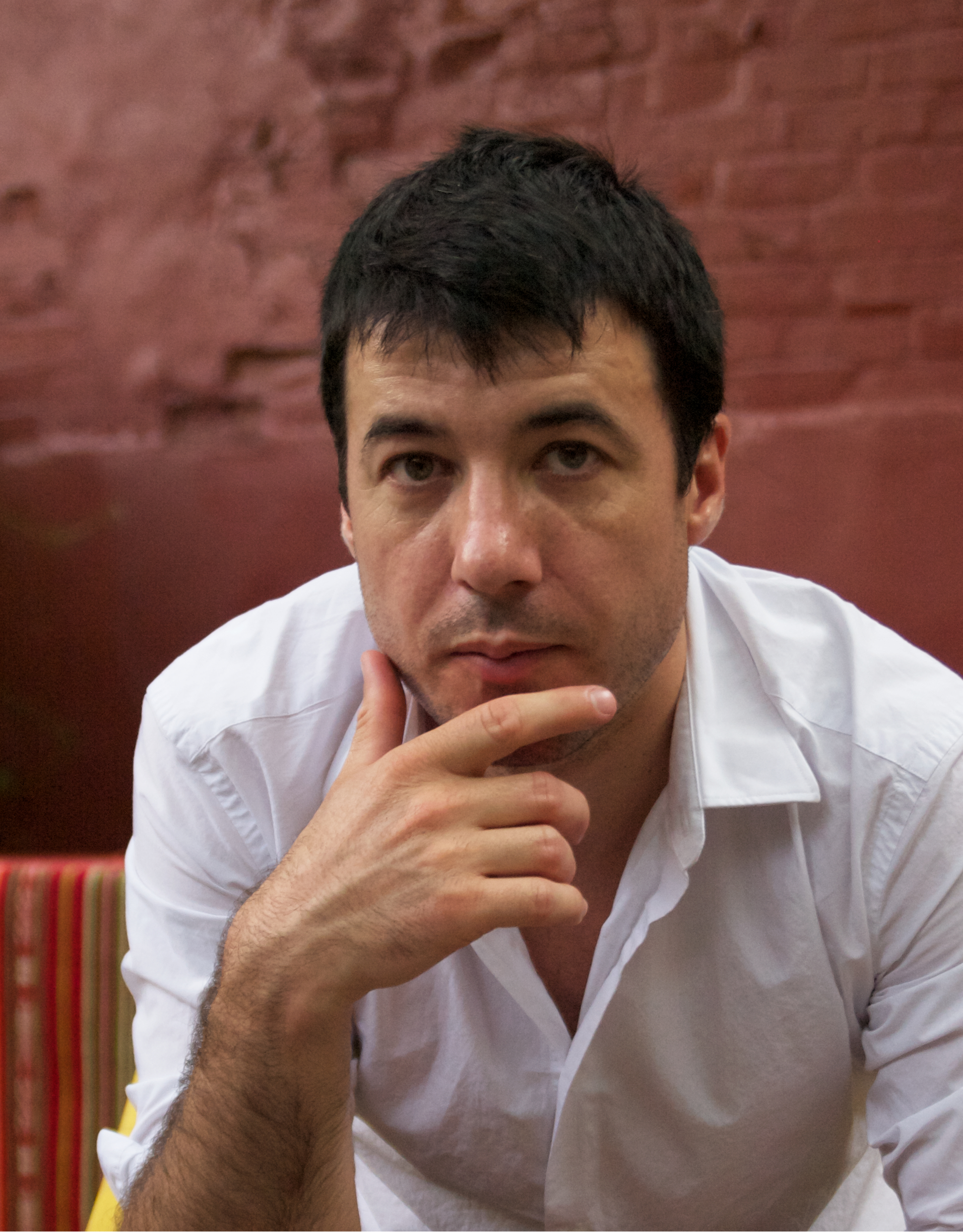
- Larue in 2013
- Born: Côtes-d'Armor, France
- Education: University of Paris IV Sorbonne (B.A. in French literature, 2000); EHESS (M.A. in history, 2002); University of Paris I Sorbonne (M.A. in philosophy, 2003); University of Strasbourg (M.A. in classical literature, 2006); Agrégation de lettres modernes (2007); University of Picardy Jules Verne (PhD in French literature, 2011)
- Occupations: Historian; professor; writer
- Known for: Creating the first vegan studies course in the United States
- Notable work: Le végétarisme et ses ennemis (2015)
- Awards: Best PhD Dissertation Award (University of Picardy Jules Verne, 2011); Prix La Bruyère silver medal (Académie Française, 2016)

Renan Larue is a French writer, literary scholar and historian of vegetarianism. He has written several books on vegetarianism and veganism, including Le végétarisme et ses ennemis (2015), a history of vegetarianism from Pythagoras to the modern period, and La pensée végane: 50 regards sur la condition animale (2020). In 2016, he taught the first vegan studies course in the United States at the University of California, Santa Barbara.

== Early life and education ==
Born in the Côtes-d'Armor, Larue studied French literature at the Paris-Sorbonne University, graduating in 2000 with a B.A.. He received three master's degrees: in history from the School for Advanced Studies in the Social Sciences in Paris in 2002, in philosophy from the University of Paris I in 2003, and in classical literature from the University of Strasbourg in 2006. In 2007, he received an Agrégation de lettres modernes.

Larue received a PhD in French literature from the University of Picardy Jules Verne in 2011. His dissertation examined the history of vegetarianism in the West and was the basis of his first book, Le végétarisme et ses ennemis.

== Career ==
Larue is an assistant professor of French literature at the University of California, Santa Barbara. In 2016, he taught a course in vegan studies, described as the first course of its kind in the United States. As of 2021, he ran the Vegan Studies program at the University of California, Santa Barbara.

=== Writing ===
In Le végétarisme et ses ennemis (2015), Larue surveys the history of vegetarianism in the West. The book discusses writers who defended vegetarianism, including Pythagoras, Porphyry and Plutarch, and examines responses to vegetarian ideas in the major monotheistic religions, with attention to the Catholic Church. It also covers the Age of Enlightenment, including Voltaire, Jean-Jacques Rousseau, Nicolas de Condorcet, Maupertuis, Bernardin de Saint-Pierre and Morelly, and ends with the founding of the Vegan Society by Donald Watson, Elsie Shrigley and others in the 20th century.

In Le véganisme (2017), co-authored with Valéry Giroux, Larue presents veganism as a philosophy, way of life, and social and political movement based on avoiding, as far as practicable, the subjugation, mistreatment and killing of sentient beings. In Le végétarisme des Lumières (2019), he examines medical and philosophical debates about vegetarianism in 18th-century France. He wrote the preface to La révolution antispéciste ("The antispeciesist revolution"), a selection of twelve texts from the journal Cahiers antispécistes ("Antispeciesist notebooks").

=== Awards ===
Larue received the Best PhD Dissertation Award from the University of Picardy Jules Verne in 2011. In 2016, the Académie Française awarded him the Prix La Bruyère silver medal for Le végétarisme et ses ennemis.

== Publications ==
- (2014). Voltaire (2014). Larue, Renan (ed.). Pensées végétariennes [Vegetarian thoughts]. Paris: Mille et une nuits. ISBN 978-2-7555-0725-6. OCLC 874779576.
- (2015). Larue, Renan (14 January 2015). Le végétarisme et ses ennemis: vingt-cinq siècles de débats [Vegetarianism and its enemies: Twenty-five centuries of debate] (in French). Paris: Presses Universitaires de France. ISBN 978-2-13-061903-1. OCLC 902800957.
- (2017). Giroux, Valéry; Larue, Renan (2017). Le véganisme [Veganism]. Paris: Que sais-je?. ISBN 978-2-13-074947-9. OCLC 1005210137.
- (2019). Larue, Renan (2019). Le végétarisme des Lumières: l'abstinence de viande dans la France du XVIIIe siècle [Vegetarianism during the Enlightenment: Abstinence from meat in 18th-century France]. Paris: Classiques Garnier. ISBN 978-2-406-08709-0. OCLC 1105220048.
- (2020). Larue, Renan. La pensée végane: 50 regards sur la condition animale [Vegan thoughts: 50 perspectives on the condition of animals]. Paris: Presses Universitaires de France. ISBN 978-2130819004
