= Eva Haifa Giraud =

External media

Audio
- "Eva Giraud: Food as Media", Unit for Biocultural Variation and Obesity (UBVO) seminars, University of Oxford
- "What Comes After Entanglement? With Eva Haifa Giraud, Knowing Animals

Video
- "Eva Giraud and Gregory Hollin on Care, Laboratory Beagles and Affective Utopia"

Eva Haifa Giraud (born 1984) is a cultural and critical theorist and a scholar of media studies and feminist science studies whose work concerns activism and non-anthropocentric theory. She is presently a senior lecturer in the Department of Sociological Studies at the University of Sheffield. Her 2019 monograph What Comes After Entanglement? Activism, Anthropocentrism, and an Ethics of Exclusion was published by Duke University Press; her second sole-authored book, Veganism: Politics, Practice and Theory, was published in 2021 by Bloomsbury.

== Education and career ==
Giraud read for a Master of Arts (MA) in English Literature at the University of Edinburgh from 2002–2006, and then went on to read for an MA (2006–7) and PhD (2007–11) in Critical Theory at the Centre for Critical Theory, University of Nottingham. Her doctoral thesis was entitled Articulating Animal Rights: Activism, Networks and Anthropocentrism. She worked at Nottingham for three years, before joining the Keele University in 2014. In 2019, she published a monograph entitled What Comes After Entanglement? Activism, Anthropocentrism, and an Ethics of Exclusion with Duke University Press.

Giraud joined the Department of Sociological Studies at the University of Sheffield as a Senior Lecturer in Digital Media & Society in 2021. In the same year, Bloomsbury Academic published her book Veganism: Politics, Practice, and Theory.

== Research ==
Giraud's research concerns the use of media by activists (including animal activists, food activists, environmental activists, and anti-racist activists); non-anthropocentric theory exploring how to live in ways that reject human exceptionalism; and online hate speech.

In What Comes After Entanglement?, Giraud addresses the theoretical idea of entanglement, which cautions theorists and activists to "avoid proposing simple solutions to the world’s complex problems". Giraud explores case studies of activism including anti-McDonald's campaigning, anti-G8 campaigning, the SPEAK campaign, and food activism in Nottingham, arguing that there is a tension between, on the one hand, theoretical work on entanglement, and, on the other, the political practice of activists. She argues for an "ethics of exclusion", which recognises that certain ways of being are inevitably foreclosed by decisions made, and that decisions sometimes have to be made. She thus challenges the charges made by certain theorists that activist decision-making essentialist and insufficiently attentive to the world's complexity; her descriptions of protest ecologies and their everyday practices of decision-making and labour organisations "trouble the notion" of staying with the trouble. One reviewer said that the book would be valuable for scholars of a wide range of disciplines; another drew attention to the ongoing conversation that Giraud was conducting with Donna Haraway, a major influence on Giraud's work; and a third argued that one of the book's major contributions was emphasising the difference between animal studies and critical animal studies.

== Selected works ==
- Elizabeth Poole and Eva Giraud, eds. (2019). Right Wing Populism and Mediated Activism: Creative Responses and Counter-Narrative. London: Open Library of Humanities.
- Eva Giraud (2019). What Comes After Entanglement? Activism, Anthropocentrism and an Ethics of Exclusion. Durham, NC: Duke University Press.
- Eva Giraud (2021). Veganism: Politics, Practice and Theory. London: Bloomsbury.
