= Jodey Castricano =

Canadian scholar of English and cultural studies

- Born: Carla Jodey Castricano; Vancouver, British Columbia

Academic background
- Education: Simon Fraser University
- Alma mater: University of British Columbia
- Thesis: In Derrida's Dream: A Poetics of a Well-Made Crypt (1997)
- Doctoral advisor: Lorraine Weir

Academic work
- Discipline: English; cultural studies
- Sub-discipline: Critical theory; critical animal studies; gothic studies
- Institutions: Wilfrid Laurier University; University of British Columbia
- Notable works: Cryptomimesis; Animal Subjects; Animal Subjects 2.0, Critical Perspecties on Veganism, Gothic Metaphysics
- Notable ideas: Cryptomimesis

Jodey Castricano is a Canadian scholar of English and cultural studies who is a Professor at the University of British Columbia, Okanagan. They are known for their work in critical theory, critical animal studies, and gothic studies.

== Education ==
Castricano originates from Vancouver, British Columbia. They worked in civil engineering as a draftsperson before beginning university studies with the intention of attending medical school. They attended Simon Fraser University from 1984, originally intending to double major in Kinesiology and English. As an undergraduate, however, they became vegan after watching The Animals Film, and reflected on their study choices after conversations with tutors about animal testing. They graduated with a Bachelor of Arts degree in English with a minor in Kinesiology in 1988. After completing their undergraduate studies, Castricano remained at Simon Fraser, studying for a Master of Arts degree in English, ultimately graduating in 1992.

From 1994 until 1997, Castricano read for a PhD in English, gothic studies, and critical theory at the Department of English at the University of British Columbia. Their thesis, which was supervised by Lorraine Weir, was entitled In Derrida's Dream: A Poetics of a Well-Made Crypt.

== Career ==
Shortly after completing their doctoral studies, Castricano took up a post at Wilfrid Laurier University, first as an assistant professor and then as an associate professor. There, they developed the university's Cultural Studies programme, incorporating critical animal studies. They also published their first book: Cryptomimesis: The Gothic and Jacques Derrida's Ghost Writing was published in 2003 by McGill-Queen's University Press. It drew from Castricano's doctoral thesis and a 2000 article by them in Gothic Studies called "Cryptomimesis: The Gothic and Jacques Derrida's Ghost Writing". In the book, Castricano examined the increased prevalence of concepts of "living-dead", "revenant", "phantom", and "crypt" in Jacques Derrida's later work. They developed the idea of cryptomimesis, a term referring to a mix of philosophy, psychoanalysis, and the gothic, to explore Derrida's claim that people must talk with ghosts.

Castricano returned to the University of British Columbia (at the new Okanagan Campus) in 2005 as an associate professor in the English and Cultural Studies, going on to publish three collections on critical animal studies. Animal Subjects: An Ethical Reader in a Posthuman World, from Wilfrid Laurier University Press, was published in 2008; Animal Subjects 2.0, also from Wilfrid Laurier and coedited with Lauren Corman, was published in 2016; and Critical Perspectives on Veganism, part of the Palgrave Macmillan Animal Ethics Series and coedited with Rasmus R. Simonsen, was published in 2016. In 2012 and 2014 respectively, Castricano served as vice president and president of the Association Literature, Environment and Culture in Canada.

Castricano was promoted to full professor in 2019. Their second monograph was published in 2021 by the University of Wales Press as part of their Gothic Literary Studies series. Gothic Metaphysics: From Alchemy to the Anthropocene challenges prevailing Freudian criticism of gothic literature in the light of the Anthropocene, instead exploring gothic connections to the worldviews of mystical traditions, including alchemy. In 2023, they became Associate Dean of Research & Graduate Studies in UBC Okanagan's Faculty of Creative and Critical Studies.

== Selected publications ==
=== As author ===
- Castricano, Jodey (2000). "Cryptomimesis: The Gothic and Jacques Derridas Ghost Writing". Gothic Studies. 2 (1): 8–22. doi:10.7227/GS.2.1.2.
- Castricano, Jodey (2003). Cryptomimesis: The Gothic and Jacques Derrida's Ghost Writing. Montreal and Kingston: McGill-Queen's University Press.
- Castricano, Jodey (2021). Gothic Metaphysics: From Alchemy to the Anthropocene. Cardiff: University of Wales Press.

=== As editor ===
- Castricano, Jodey, ed. (2008). Animal Subjects: An Ethical Reader in a Posthuman World. Waterloo, Ontario: Wilfrid Laurier University Press.
- Castricano, Jodey; Corman, Lauren, eds. (2016). Animal Subjects 2.0. Waterloo, Ontario: Wilfrid Laurier University Press.
- Castricano, Jodey; Simonsen, Rasmus R., eds. (2016). Critical Perspectives on Veganism. Basingstoke: Palgrave Macmillan.
