= Carol J. Adams =

American author and activist

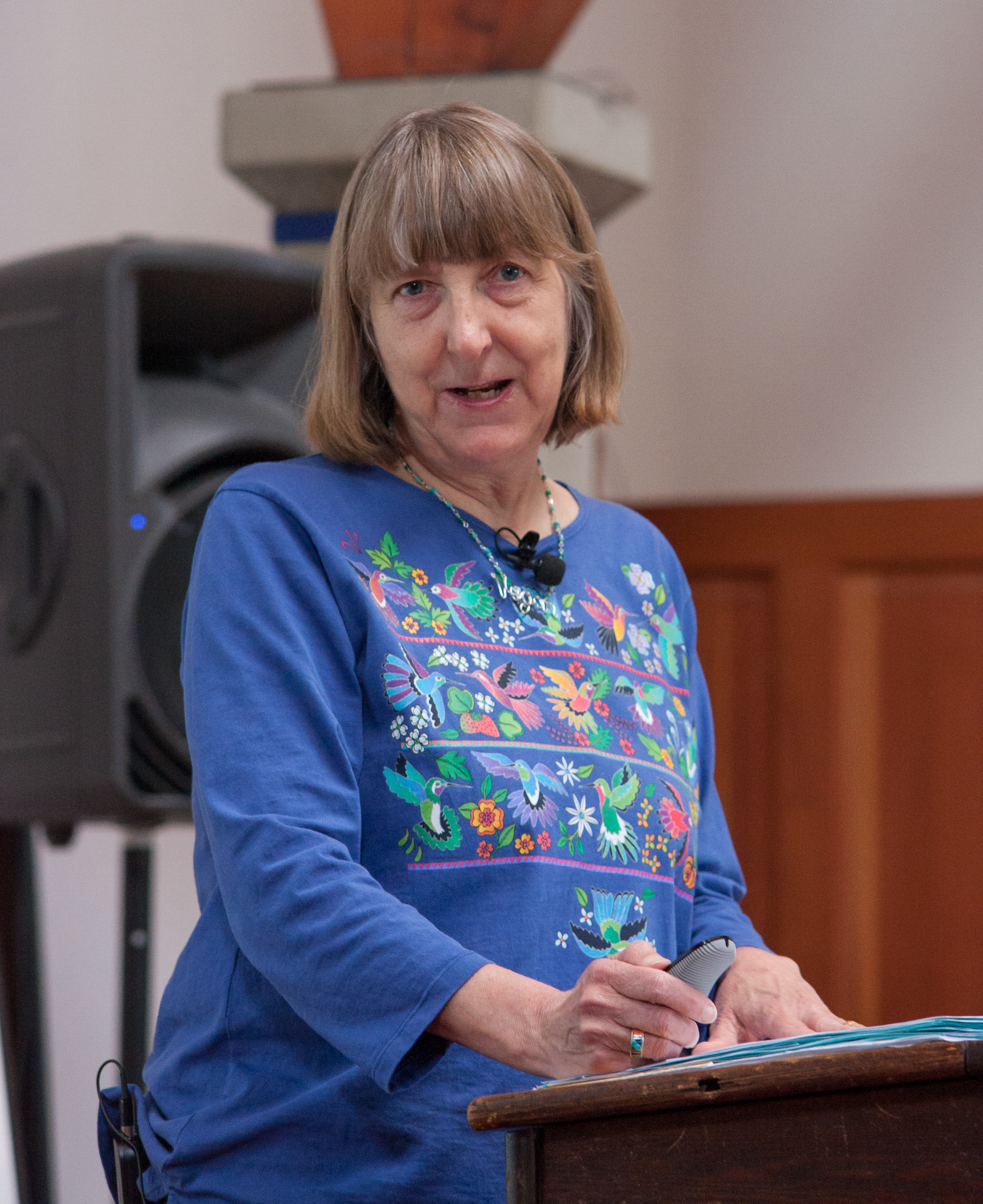
- Adams speaks at the Intersectional Justice Conference, March 2016.
- Born: 1951 (age 74–75); New York, U.S.
- Education: University of Rochester; Yale Divinity School
- Notable work: The Sexual Politics of Meat (1990); The Pornography of Meat (2004)
- Spouse: Rev. Dr. Bruce Buchanan
- Website: www.caroljadams.com

Carol J. Adams (born 1951) is an American writer, feminist, and animal rights advocate. She is the author of several books, including The Sexual Politics of Meat: A Feminist-Vegetarian Critical Theory (1990) and The Pornography of Meat (2004), focusing in particular on what she argues are the links between the oppression of women and that of non-human animals. She was inducted into the Animal Rights Hall of Fame in 2011.

== Biography ==
Carol J. Adams was born in New York in 1951. She is a feminist-vegan, advocate, activist, and independent scholar whose work explores the cultural construction of inter-sectional oppression. At a young age, Adams was influenced by her mother, who was both a feminist and a civil rights activist, and also her father who she recalls, was a lawyer who participated in one of the first lawsuits regarding the pollution of Lake Erie, one of the Great Lakes in the north eastern region of the United States. Adams was raised in Forestville, a small village in New York. After skipping a grade and taking college English courses in high school, Adams attended the University of Rochester and majored in English and History. As an undergraduate at the University of Rochester, she was involved in bringing women's studies courses to the university's course catalog. She graduated from there with a BA in 1972, and obtained her Master of Divinity degree from Yale Divinity School in 1976. In 1974 Adams moved to Boston to study with Mary Daly. Adams recalls her time with Mary as, "a fascinating time of conversation and mutual critique...My evolving feminist-veganism and her evolving biophilic philosophy bumped up against each other at times. Usually, at least in the beginning, she had the last word."^{[a]}

Adams recalls discovering the dead body of her family pony that was killed in a hunting accident, then eating a hamburger that night. She concluded that it was hypocritical for her to mourn the death of her pony, yet have no problem eating a slaughtered cow. This marked the beginning of her vegetarian journey. She is also a pioneer of feminist care theory in animal ethics. Adams continues to work towards the ethical treatment of animals and other forms of activism. She does this through visiting colleges, teaching courses, and through the internet and different forums of social media in which she can reach out to a wider audience. During the past five years Adams has been very involved in helping to create this innovative urban development spearheaded by The Stewpot in Dallas, Texas. Adams has also been working on a theoretical autobiography and on a book about Jane Austen and care giving. She has also been working on a project on "Towards a Philosophy of Care through Care." An essay about this is forthcoming in Critical Inquiry. Adams continues to show The Sexual Politics of Meat Slide Show to help and spread her theories as she can. Lastly Adams is completing a book with her co-authors Patti Breitman and Virginia Messina, Even Vegans Die. Carol J. Adams in regards to her intentions on this planet said, "In my life, I want to do the least harm possible ... I want to walk lightly on this Earth." and the accomplishments of her life and her goals and ambitions have reflected this philosophy. Adams was chosen as one of "20 Badass Veg Women Who Are Making History" by a website called chooseveg.com. Others among the list were the once world number one for women's tennis, Venus Williams and Ellen DeGeneres.

Adams is one of several people who provided information used in the writing of the book Striking at the Roots: A Practical Guide to Animal Activism (2008) by Mark Hawthorne.

== Career ==
=== The Sexual Politics of Meat: A Feminist-Vegetarian Critical Theory ===
The Sexual Politics of Meat: A Feminist-Vegetarian Critical Theory discusses how, especially in times of shortage, women often give men the meat they perceive to be the "best" food. She also discusses the connections between feminism and vegetarianism, and patriarchy and meat eating, historically and through the reading of literary texts. An important theory formulated in the book is the absent referent, which she uses to explain the fact that people keep eating meat, and is also behind the objectification of women in pornography.

In The Sexual Politics of Meat, Adams parallels the patriarchal system with the relationship between humans and animals. The male connotations associated with meat eating, not only highlights species inequality, but also defines distinct gender roles. Simply, meat signifies male dominance over females as "men who batter women have often used the absence of meat as a pretext for violence against women." Adams proclaims that our culture has become preoccupied with reducing non-human animals to a source of consumption, a fragmentation of their individual species. A recurring theme throughout her work is that men that feel a sense of entitlement over animals are similar to men who abuse, exploit, or degrade women for their bodies.

=== Animals and Women: Feminist Theoretical Explorations ===
In Adam's Animals and Women: Feminist Theoretical Explorations, she argues that the social context behind female oppression and sexual violence has a direct tie to the way humans mistreat other species. Humans tend to deem animals as an inferior species and in this way, justify their actions regarding animal exploitation. According to Adams, men regard women in a similar light. This sense of entitlement over animals translates into human relations and men begin to label women as inferior as well "available for abuse." The established discourse shifts from a negative image for nonhuman animals to a sexist portrayal of women. Constantly, men refer to women using language such as dogs, chicks, bunny, which all indicate men using women as a mere means. Given current speciesism, individuals use non-human animals for their production, i.e. cows for milk, hens for eggs, or female dog to breed more puppies. Humans use chicks as simply physical beings similar to how men may exploit the female body for pleasure.

=== The Pornography of Meat ===
In The Pornography of Meat, Adams draws the visual comparison between meat advertised on a shelf and women portrayed in particular advertisements or magazines. The idea of consumption plays a significant role in a culture that compare women to a product, something that's not only attainable, but a consumable person. Consumption may refer to literal digestion or rather simply, a desire for someone considered attainable by another individual. Adams juxtaposes commonly unnoticed advertisements in the local grocery store to sexist and misogynistic images of women. Further, she creates the "A" category, which creates an idea of white male supremacy in a civilized society, whereas the other in this sense, includes language that relates to different races, non-human animals, and women. Adams argues that modern culture idealizes the white male figure and demonstrates that he represents an advanced civilized society. The author argues that any individual who does not fall into the "A" category likely faces a reference to animals, now seen as derogatory and inferior. In this work, she includes an image of women labeled according to her body parts similar to how butcher advertises meat cuts. The underlying premise remains the same; current culture has created a desire for consumption from non-human animals, genders, and races.

=== Other works ===
She is the author of several other books, including Living Among Meat Eaters: The Vegetarian's Survival Handbook. This book advises vegetarians to ask if they are at peace with their own vegetarianism and provides communication skills for avoiding abuse while dining with meat-eating friends, family, and coworkers who may be hostile. Her most recent work, Burger, follows the history, business, culture, and gendered politics of the hamburger. All the while, drawing upon the history of the veggie burger, and its revival through contemporary investors in the food industry.

== Activism ==
Adams' activism includes "experience of working for social justice (which includes justice for nonhuman animals) and against domestic violence, homelessness, racism, and violence against animals." A large part of Adams' life is dedicated to feminism as well. She was raised in a household with her two sisters where this spirit of feminism was nurtured. Her vegetarianism came after her feminism. While a sophomore at the University of Rochester she attended her first Women's Liberation meeting and later did field work at the Women's Liberation Center. These experiences and research, as well as the event of her pony being killed, showed her that her feminism and vegetarianism were related. Through some feminist studies she was conducting she realized that both were connected throughout the history of feminism as well. She found that many feminists were vegetarians, and she also found multiple books written by feminists, on vegetarianism as a "part of the feminist awakening of the hero". A further look into the newly connected themes proved to be very important to the course Adams' work would take in the future. She found that a patriarchal ethics "naturalizes and normalizes violence...and perpetuates human exceptionalism that permits the oppression of other beings". Thus her theory of the patriarchal essence begins, and the creation of The Sexual Politics of Meat: A Feminist-Vegetarian Critical Theory took form.

Adams has explained that her activism taught her how to write by allowing her to think about how "ideas are experienced by others". Fighting on the non-dominant side of things through her activism allowed her to return to her book-writing with a deeper level of understanding sufficient to know what was going on. The voice she had in her activism in the 1970s also helped her obtain her theoretical voice used in her books. Adams explains, in many interviews, that her activism taught her how to write.

In her chapter, "What Came Before the Sexual Politics of Meat" in the book Species Matters: Humane Advocacy and Cultural Theory, Adams explains that she and her husband were activists in the 1970s against racism. They lived in Dunkirk, New York and tried to make the area progressive by pushing for minority housing to move into the rural area. Her husband, the local minister was receiving inflammatory letters from his congregation and Adams fought with inner self between doing as much as she can, and stopping where the situation became dangerous. She was spoken about on the call-in radio show "What's Your Opinion". One day when she was listening she was so furious about the inaccurate information being told that she called in and corrected all the misinformation. Regardless of what people said, Adams and her husband continued their activism and fight for low-to-moderate income housing.

Further, in her life Adams has supported animal rights and wants to educate people about vegan food and introducing people to vegan eating. She explains we all get protein from plants, some people get it directly from plants and others chose to let animals process protein for them; she has also coined the term feminized protein for eggs and dairy products, as it is plant protein produced by using the reproductive cycle of female animals.

== Personal life ==
Adams was executive director of the Chautauqua County Rural Ministry, Inc., Dunkirk, New York, from the late 1970s to 1987. She lives in Texas with her husband, Reverend Dr. Bruce Buchanan, and is a member of the First Presbyterian Church of Dallas, where her husband is an associate pastor.

== Publications ==
- The Sexual Politics of Meat: A Feminist-Vegetarian Critical Theory. Continuum, 1990. ISBN 0-8264-0455-3
- Ecofeminism and the Sacred. Continuum, 1993. ISBN 0-8264-0586-X
- Neither Man nor Beast: Feminism and the Defense of Animals. Continuum, 1994. ISBN 0-8264-0670-X
- Woman-battering: Creative pastoral care and counseling series. Fortress Press, 1994. ISBN 0-8006-2785-7
- with Marie M. Fortune. Violence against Women and Children: A Christian Theological Sourcebook. Continuum, 1995.
- with Josephine Donovan. Animals and women: Feminist theoretical explorations. Duke University Press, 1995. ISBN 0-8223-1667-6
- The inner art of vegetarianism: Spiritual practices for body and soul. Lantern Books, 2000. ISBN 1-930051-13-1
- Journey to gameland: How to make a board game from your favorite children's book. Lantern Books, 2001. ISBN 1-930051-51-4
- with Howard Williams. The Ethics of Diet: A Catena of Authorities Deprecatory of the Practice of Flesh-eating. University of Illinois Press, 2003. ISBN 0-252-07130-1
- "Bitch, Chick, Cow: Women's and (Other) Animals' Rights" in Sisterhood Is Forever: The Women's Anthology for a New Millennium. Washington Square Press 2003. ISBN 0-7434-6627-6.
- Help! My child stopped eating meat!: An A-Z guide to surviving a conflict in diets. Continuum 2004. ISBN 0-8264-1583-0
- The Pornography of Meat. Continuum, 2004. ISBN 0-8264-1646-2
- Prayers for Animals. Continuum, 2004. ISBN 0-8264-1651-9
- God listens when you're sad: Prayers when your animal friend is sick or dies. Pilgrim Press, 2005. ISBN 0-8298-1667-4
- God listens to your love : prayers for living with animal friends. Pilgrim Press, 2005. ISBN 0-8298-1665-8
- God listens to your care : prayers for all the animals of the world. Pilgrim Press, 2006. ISBN 0-8298-1666-6
- with Douglas Buchanan and Kelly Gesch. Bedside, bathtub and armchair companion to Frankenstein. Continuum, 2007. ISBN 0-8264-1824-4
- The Feminist Care Tradition in Animal Ethics: A Reader. Columbia University Press, 2007. Edited by Carol J. Adams and Josephine Donovan. ISBN 978-0-231-14038-6
- How to eat like a vegetarian even if you never want to be one: More than 250 shortcuts, strategies, and simple solutions. Lantern Books, 2008. ISBN 978-1-59056-137-9
- Living among meat eaters: The vegetarians' survival handbook. Lantern Books, 2008. ISBN 978-1-59056-116-4
- The foreword to Lisa Kemmerer's anthology Sister Species: Women, Animals, and Social Justice. University of Illinois Press, 2011. ISBN 978-0-252-07811-8
- The foreword to Laura Wright's The Vegan Studies Project University of Georgia Press, 2015.

== See also ==
- Brown Dog affair
- List of animal rights advocates
- Lizzy Lind af Hageby
- Women and animal advocacy

== Notes ==
a. Also see Bakeman, Jessica. "Student Survival '08: Campus secrets and legends" Archived 2012-03-29 at the Wayback Machine, City newspaper, August 13, 2008.
