= Western religions =

Religions that originated within Western culture

The Western religions are the religions that originated within Western culture, which are thus historically, culturally, and theologically distinct from Eastern, African, and Iranian religions. The term Abrahamic religions (Judaism, Christianity, and Islam) is often used instead of the East and West terminology, as these originated in the Middle East.

Western culture itself was significantly influenced by the emergence of Christianity and its adoption as the state church of the Roman Empire in the late 4th century and the term "Christendom" largely indicates this intertwined history. Western Christianity was significantly influenced by Hellenistic religion (notably neoplatonism) as well as the Roman imperial cult. Western Christianity is largely based on the Catholic Church's Latin Church tradition, as opposed to Eastern Orthodoxy, from which it was divided by the Great Schism of the 11th century, and further includes all Protestant traditions that split from the Catholic Church from the 16th century onward.

Since the 19th century, Western religion has diversified into numerous new religious movements, including Occultism, Spiritism and diverse forms of Neopaganism.

== Antiquity ==
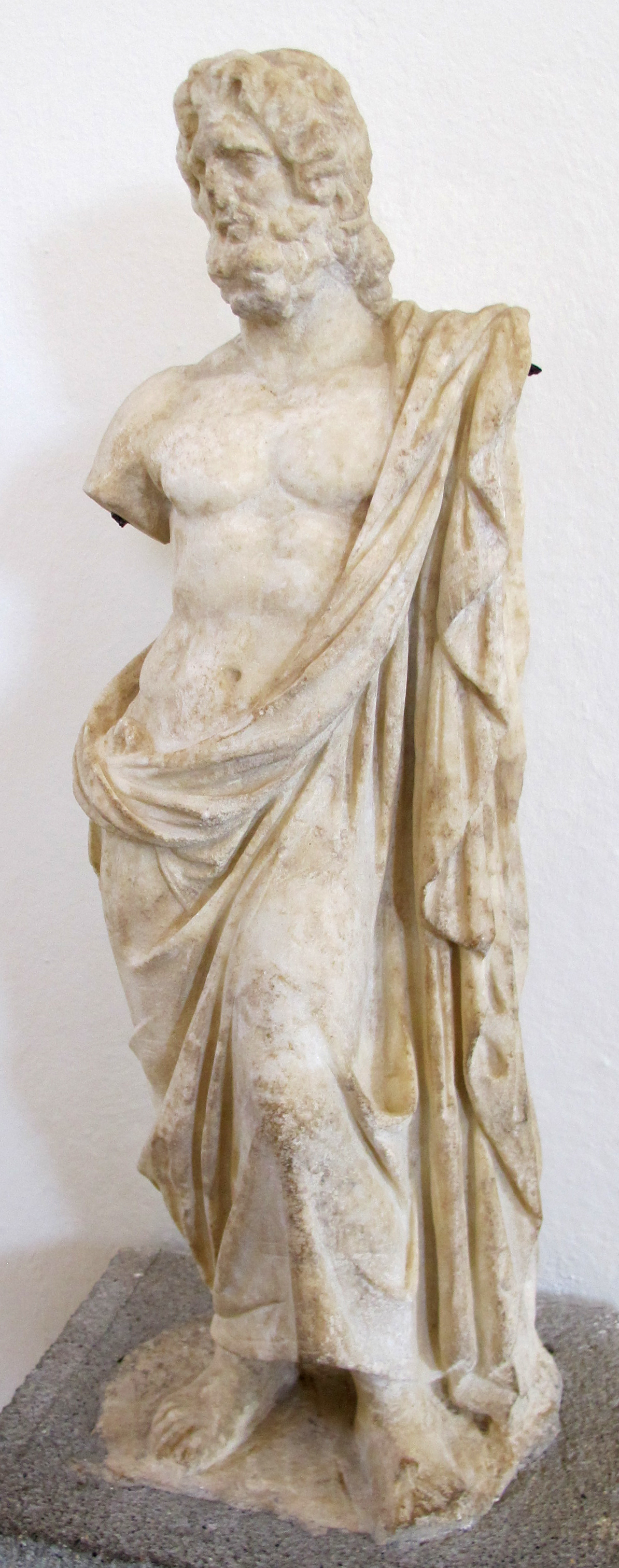
Statue of Zeus in Rhodes, Greece

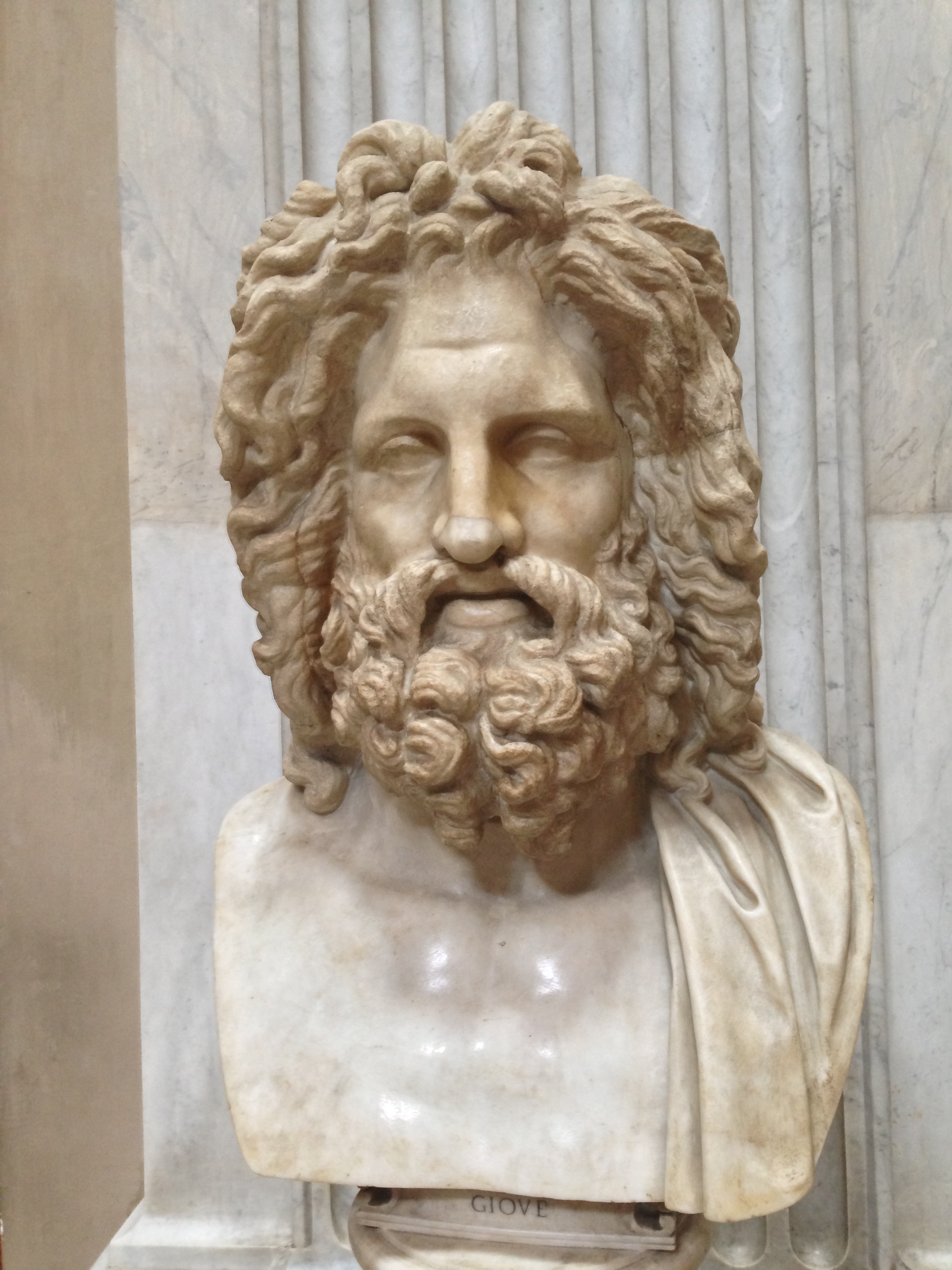
Bust of Jupiter in Rome, Italy

The West as a culture or civilization historically evolved out of Greco-Roman classical antiquity. These cultures had polytheistic religions, viz. Greek polytheism and Roman polytheism. Eastern influences on these religions are evident from the earliest times, the Orientalizing period at the very beginning of Greek antiquity.

During Hellenism and the Roman Empire period, Eastern (Oriental) religions exerted a considerable influence on "Western" religion, giving rise to Persian influenced traditions like Gnosticism and Mithraism, as well as Egyptian and Chaldean influence on mystery religions (Orphism), astrology and magic. Early Christianity itself is a further example of Orientalizing influence on the later Roman Empire.

During the same period, inherited traditions of native Roman religion were marginalized or overlaid by interpretatio graeca, and the Roman imperial cult evolved into a civil religion which involved state ritual rather than religious faith or experience. Celtic and Germanic religion was described by Roman ethnography as primitive, but at the same time as pure or unspoiled compared to the so-called urban decadence of Rome.

== Western Christianity ==
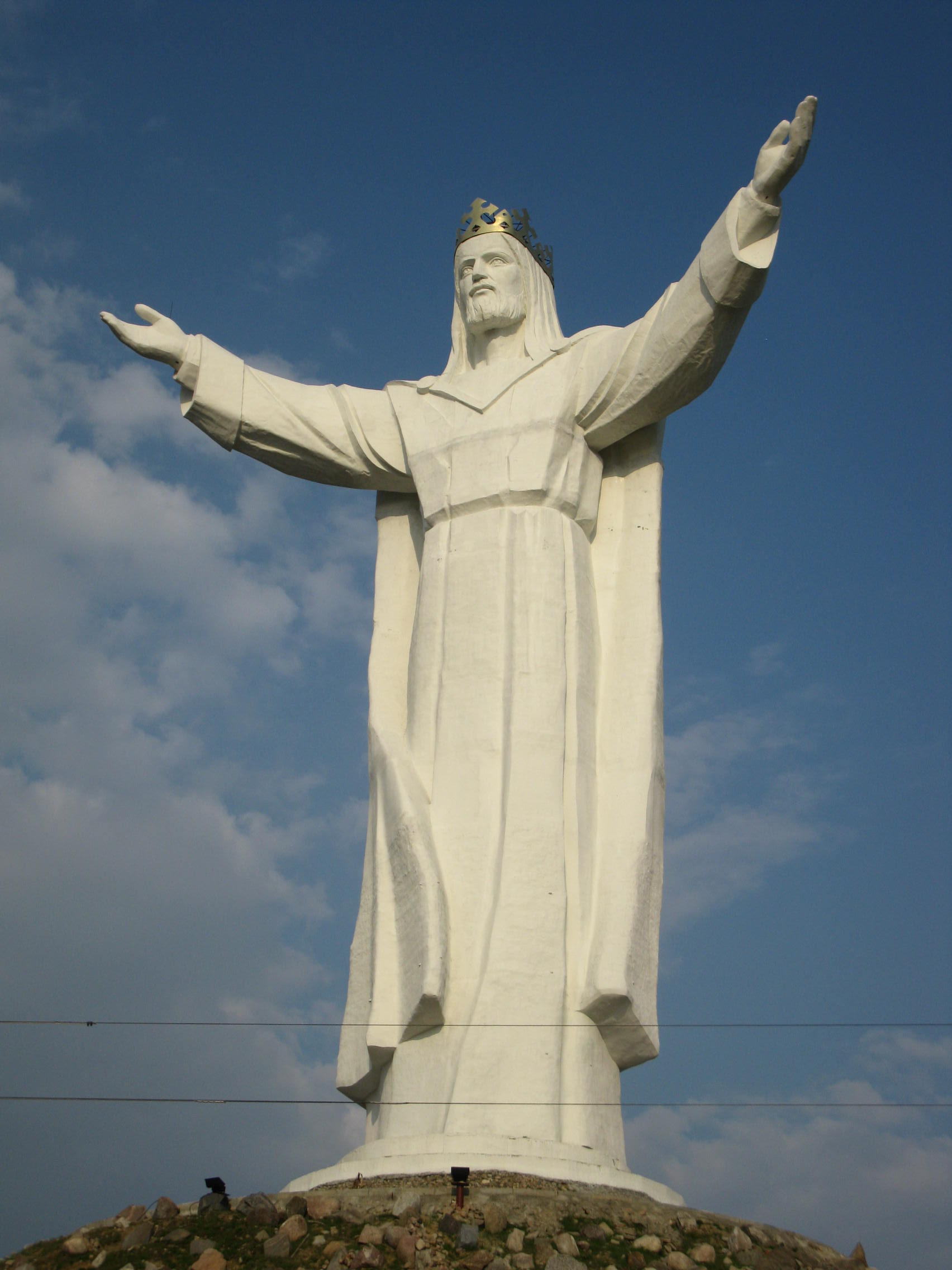
The Christ the King statue of Jesus in Świebodzin, Poland.

Western Christianity is a subset of Christianity, originally based on the Latin Christianity of the Catholic Church, as opposed to Eastern Orthodoxy – from which it was divided during the Great Schism of the 11th century – and various other non-western Christian movements. Western Christianity itself was divided by the Protestant Reformation in the 16th century, and pronouncedly "Western" forms of Christianity include Puritanism and Evangelicalism, movements resulting from the various "Great Awakenings" in the 18th to 20th century English-speaking world and popularly practiced in the United States.

For at least a millennium and a half, Europe has been nearly equivalent to Christian culture. The Christian culture was the predominant force in Western civilization, guiding the course of philosophy, art, music, science, social structure and architecture.

== Renaissance magic ==
Renaissance magic was a resurgence in Hermeticism and Neoplatonic varieties of the magical arts which arose along with Renaissance humanism in the 15th and 16th centuries CE. During the Renaissance period, magic and occult practices underwent significant changes that reflected shifts in cultural, intellectual, and religious perspectives. C. S. Lewis, in his work on English literature, highlighted the transformation in how magic was perceived and portrayed. In medieval stories, magic had a fantastical and fairy-like quality, while in the Renaissance, it became more complex and tied to the idea of hidden knowledge that could be explored through books and rituals. This change is evident in the works of authors like Spenser, Marlowe, Chapman, and Shakespeare, who treated magic as a serious and potentially dangerous pursuit.

== Secularization ==
Following the religious wars of the 16th to 17th centuries, the Age of Enlightenment of the 18th century paved the way for a detachment of society and politics from religious questions. Inspired by the American Revolution, the French Revolution brought the idea of secularization and a laicist state granting freedom of religion to Europe. After the turmoils of the Napoleonic Wars, this development caught hold in other parts of Europe, utilizing the German mediatization and the separation of church and state in various European constitutions drawn up after the revolutions of 1848.

== New religious movements ==
The principle of religious freedom introduced in Western society in the early 19th century facilitated the emergence of various new religious movements. First examples were derived from western occultism and the tradition of secret societies such as the Freemasons, but from the later 19th century, the influence of Eastern religions, notably Buddhism and Hinduism played an increasing role. From the mid 20th century, Eastern and Western spiritual traditions were increasingly syncretized in the various movements associated with the New Age and Neopagan countercultures.

== Religions in the Western world today ==
The Western world, taken as consisting of Europe, the Americas, Australia-New Zealand and (in part) South Africa and Philippines, are predominantly Western Christian: 77.4% in North America (2012), 90% in Latin America (2011), close to 76.2% in Europe (2010), (includes 35% of European Christians who are Eastern Orthodox especially in Eastern Europe, 76%, not properly part of "Western religion", 46% of European Christians are Roman Catholic, 18% of European Christians are Protestant), 61.1% in Australia-New Zealand (2011), 79% in South Africa and 90% in the Philippines.

The second largest religions in all these regions are smaller by at least an order of magnitude, Islam in Europe (6%) with about 4%, Islam in Canada with about 3%, Judaism in the United States with about 1.7%, and Islam in Australia with about 1.7%.

Most non-Christians in the Western world are irreligious, 22% in Australia, 40% in New Zealand, 18.2% in Europe, 16.4% in the USA and 16% in Canada, (Latin America, South Africa and Philippines are more religious). This is a reflection of the tradition of secular humanism which culminated in the 18th century Age of Enlightenment.

There remains a minority of the order of 5% of the population in the Western world which adheres to non-Western religions, mostly due to recent immigration, but to some extent also due to proselytization, notably conversion to various sects of Buddhism and Hinduism in the context of the New Age movement in the later part of the 20th century.
