= Andrew Linzey =

English priest and theologian (born 1952)

The Reverend Andrew Linzey
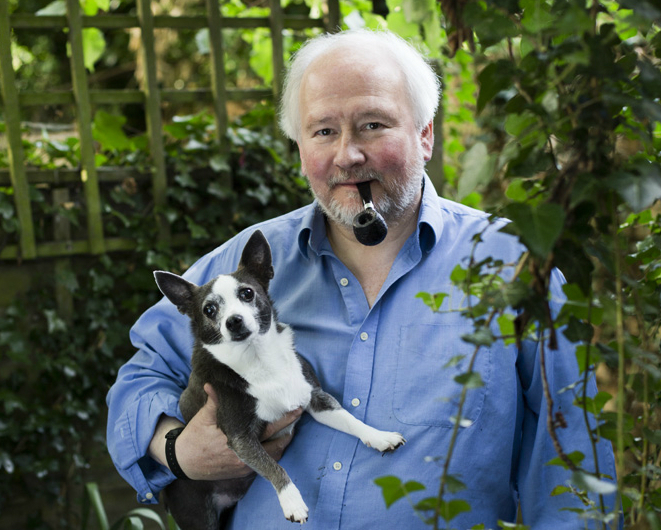
- Linzey in 2016

Personal life
- Born: 2 February 1952 (age 74) Oxford, England
- Children: Clair Linzey
- Notable works: Animal Rights: A Christian Perspective (1976); Christianity and the Rights of Animals (1987); Animal Theology (1994); Why Animal Suffering Matters (2009)
- Education: King's College London
- Occupation: Priest; theologian

Religious life
- Religion: Christianity
- Denomination: Anglicanism
- Church: Church of England

Senior posting
- Influenced by: Karl Barth; Dietrich Bonhoeffer; Humphrey Primatt; Tom Regan; Albert Schweitzer
- Awards: Peaceable Kingdom Medal (1990); Doctor of Divinity (2001)

Andrew Linzey (born 2 February 1952) is an English Anglican priest and theologian whose work concerns animal theology, Christian ethics, animal rights, animal welfare, and Christian vegetarianism. He is a member of the Faculty of Theology and Religion at the University of Oxford, and has held the Bede Jarrett Senior Research Fellowship in Ethics, Theology and Animal Welfare at Blackfriars Hall.

Linzey is the founder and director of the Oxford Centre for Animal Ethics, an independent academic centre opened in November 2006 for the study and discussion of animal ethics. His books on animals and theology include Animal Rights: A Christian Perspective (1976), Christianity and the Rights of Animals (1987), Animal Theology (1994), and Why Animal Suffering Matters: Philosophy, Theology, and Practical Ethics (2009). He is co-editor, with his daughter Clair Linzey, of the Journal of Animal Ethics, and a series editor with Clair, previously with Priscilla Cohn, of the Palgrave Macmillan Animal Ethics Series.

== Career ==
Linzey has authored or edited 30 books and published more than 100 articles. He has lectured and broadcast in Europe and the United States. His writings have appeared in translation in several languages, including Italian, French, Polish, Spanish, German, Chinese, Taiwanese, and Japanese.

One of his quoted statements on animals and Christian theology is:

Animals are God's creatures, not human property, nor utilities, nor resources, nor commodities, but precious beings in God's sight. ... Christians whose eyes are fixed on the awfulness of crucifixion are in a special position to understand the awfulness of innocent suffering. The Cross of Christ is God's absolute identification with the weak, the powerless, and the vulnerable, but most of all with unprotected, undefended, innocent suffering.

He has criticised Christian attitudes to animals, saying that "Christians haven't got much further than thinking that the whole world was made for us, with the result that animals are only seen in an instrumental way as objects, machines, tools, and commodities, rather than fellow creatures". In 2012, Christian Today reported that Linzey had called for people convicted of animal cruelty to be placed on a register and barred from keeping or working with animals.

== Honours ==
In 1990, Linzey was awarded the Peaceable Kingdom Medal for his work in theology and animals. In June 2001, George Carey, Archbishop of Canterbury, awarded him a Doctor of Divinity degree in recognition of his "unique and massive pioneering work in the area of the theology of creation with particular reference to the rights and welfare of God's sentient creatures". In 2006, after the creation of the Oxford Centre for Animal Ethics, Linzey was named the Henry Bergh Professor of Animal Ethics at the Graduate Theological Foundation in the United States.

== Selected works ==
Author

- —— (1976). Animal Rights: A Christian Perspective. London: SCM Press.
- —— (1987). Christianity and the Rights of Animals. London: SPCK.
- —— (1989). Christianity and the Rights of Animals. New York: Crossroad.
- —— (1994). Animal Theology. London: SCM Press.
- ——; Cohn-Sherbok, Dan (1997). After Noah: Animals and the Liberation of Theology. London: Mowbray.
- —— (1998). Animal Gospel: The Christian Defense of Animals. Hodder & Stoughton Religious. ISBN 0-340-62150-8.
- —— (1999). Animal Gospel: Christian Faith as If Animals Mattered. London: Hodder and Stoughton.
- —— (1999). Animal Rites: Liturgies of Animal Care. London: SCM Press.
- —— (2001). Animal Rites: Liturgies of Animal Care. Cleveland, Ohio: The Pilgrim Press.
- —— (2009). Creatures of the Same God: Explorations in Animal Theology. New York: Lantern Books. ISBN 978-1-59056-142-3.
- —— (2009). Why Animal Suffering Matters: Philosophy, Theology, and Practical Ethics. Oxford University Press. ISBN 978-0-19-537977-8.

Editor

- ——; Regan, Tom, eds. (1988). Song of Creation: An Anthology of Poems in Praise of Animals. London: Marshall Pickering.
- ——; Regan, Tom, eds. (1989). Animals and Christianity: A Book of Readings. London: SPCK.
- ——; Regan, Tom, eds. (1990). Animals and Christianity: A Book of Readings. New York: Crossroad.
- ——; Clarke, P. A. B., eds. (1990). Political Theory and Animal Rights. London: Pluto Press.
- ——, ed. (2005). The Animal World Encyclopaedia. Kingsley Media.
- ——; Wexler, Peter, eds. (1991). Fundamentalism and Tolerance. Canterbury Papers. Bellew Publishing. ISBN 0-947792-74-0.
- ——, ed. (1995). Dictionary of Ethics, Theology and Society. Routledge.
- ——; Yamamoto, Dorothy, eds. (1998). Animals on the Agenda: Questions about Animals for Theology and Ethics. London: SCM Press.
- ——; Yamamoto, Dorothy, eds. (1999). Animals on the Agenda: Questions about Animals for Theology and Ethics. Chicago: University of Illinois Press.
- ——, ed. (2005). Gays and the Future of Anglicanism: Responses to the Windsor Report. O Books. ISBN 1-905047-38-X.
- ——; Clarke, Paul Barry, eds. (2005). Animal Rights: A Historical Anthology. Columbia University Press. ISBN 0-231-13420-7.
- ——, ed. (2013). The Global Guide to Animal Protection. Foreword by Desmond Tutu. University of Illinois Press. ISBN 978-0-252-07919-1.

== See also ==
- List of animal rights advocates
- Chaplain § Animal
- Christianity and animal rights
- RSPCA Reform Group
- Vegetarianism and religion
