= Animal theology =

Theological reflection on non-human animals

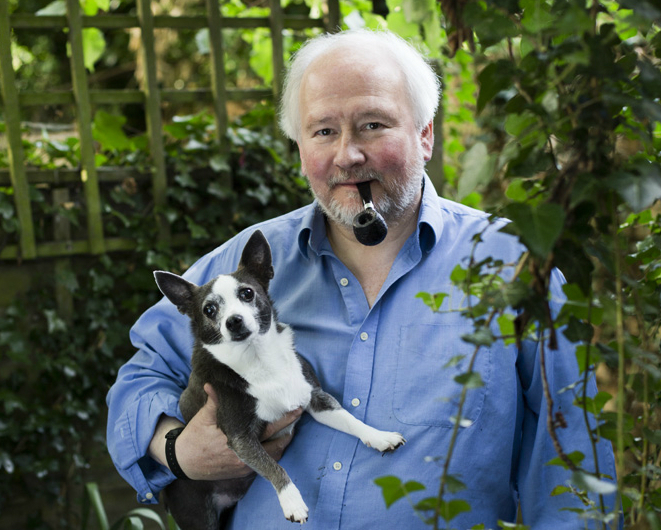
Andrew Linzey, whose work helped establish animal theology as an academic field

Animal theology is theological reflection on non-human animals, including their place in creation, moral status, relationship with humans, and the ethical implications of human treatment of them, particularly questions of animal welfare and animal rights. The modern academic field has developed especially within Christian theology, although the term is also used in relation to other religious and philosophical traditions.

Theological arguments concerning the status and treatment of animals predate the modern field. Its precursors include Christian thinkers such as John Wesley, Humphry Primatt, Frances Power Cobbe, Albert Schweitzer and C. S. Lewis. Emil Børty Nielsen dates the establishment of animal theology as an academic field to the 1990s through the work of theologian Andrew Linzey, while B. V. E. Hyde similarly describes the field as having been largely created by Linzey's 1994 book Animal Theology.

== Scope ==
Within Christianity, animal theology examines biblical understandings of animal life, human–animal relationships, animal redemption, and human responsibilities towards other animals. It also addresses anthropocentrism, animal suffering, and questions of animal welfare and animal rights. Ryan McLaughlin places animal theology alongside ecotheology, liberation theology, ecofeminism, creation spirituality and Indigenous spirituality among approaches that have contributed to modern Christian theological reflection on non-human animals.

Andrew and Clair Linzey's 2023 collection Animal Theologians includes Christian, Jewish, Muslim and Hindu thinkers, as well as figures from other religious and philosophical traditions. Animal theology overlaps with the broader interdisciplinary study of animals and religion, which includes theoretical, descriptive and normative approaches to animals across religious traditions, including Judaism, Christianity, Islam, Hinduism, Jainism, Buddhism and Daoism.

Hyde distinguishes animal theology from the broader study of theological attitudes towards animals, characterising animal theology as an activist field of study.

== Development ==
=== Precursors ===
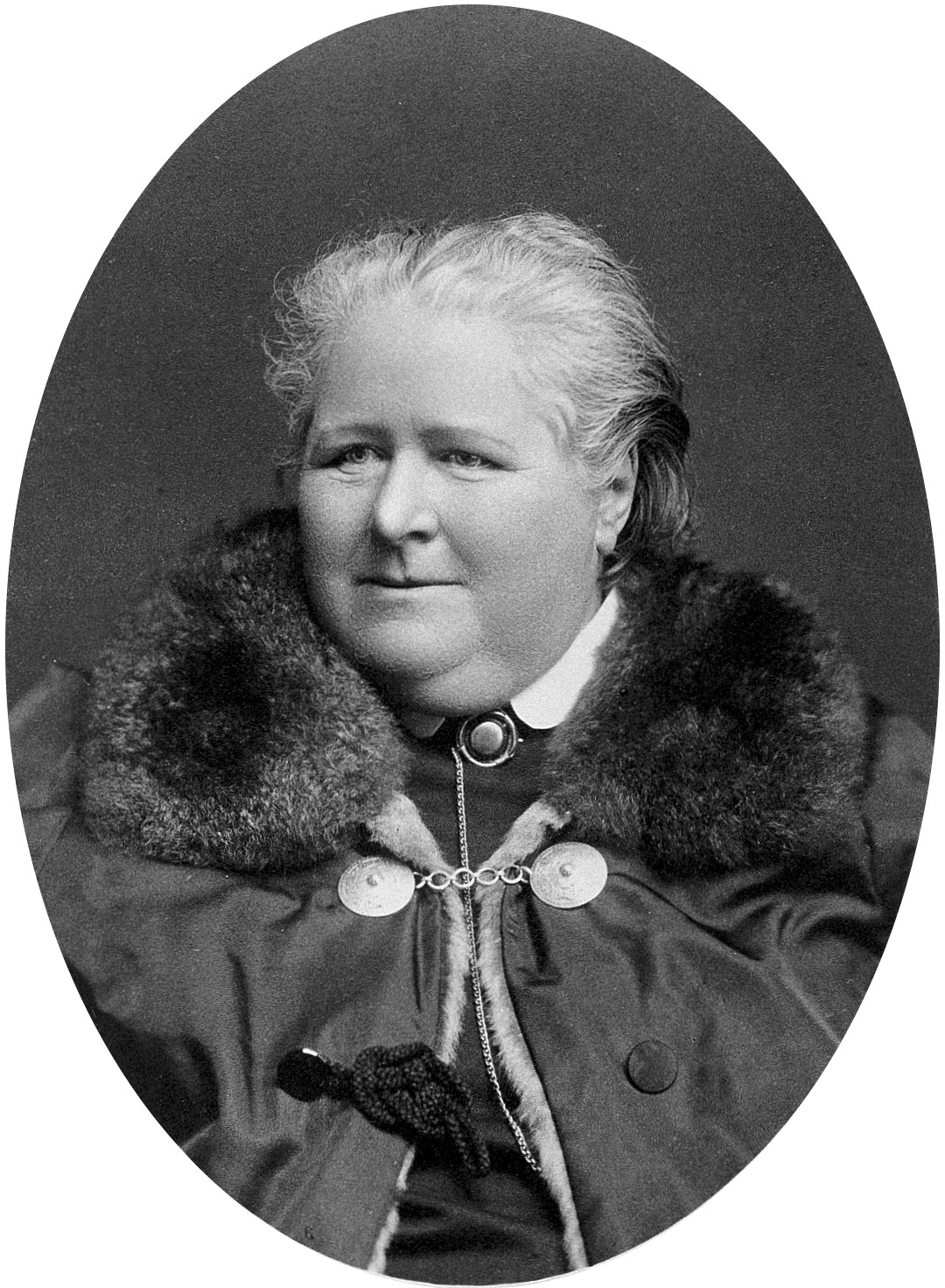
Frances Power Cobbe, whose opposition to vivisection drew on her religious thought

Theological arguments concerning the treatment and status of animals predate the modern field. McLaughlin identifies John Wesley, Humphry Primatt and Albert Schweitzer among earlier Christian thinkers who provided less anthropocentric accounts of animals. Frances Power Cobbe connected theological arguments about animals with her opposition to vivisection, drawing on her religious criticism of materialism and utilitarianism. Animal Theologians includes earlier writers from several religious and philosophical traditions, including Pierre Gassendi, Michel de Montaigne, Thomas Tryon, Muhammad Abduh and Mahatma Gandhi.

C. S. Lewis addressed the theological problem of animal suffering in The Problem of Pain (1940), considering animal sentience, predation, the effects of the Fall on animals, and the possibility of animal immortality. Hyde identifies Lewis's treatment of animal suffering as contributing to the formulation of the predation problem. He also opposed vivisection, arguing in a 1947 essay that uncertainty about animal consciousness could not justify inflicting pain on animals.

=== Modern field ===
McLaughlin identifies Andrew Linzey's Animal Rights: A Christian Assessment (1976), alongside the work of animal ethicists Peter Singer and Tom Regan, as helping to introduce questions of animal welfare and animal rights into contemporary theology. Linzey later published Animal Theology in 1994, which Nielsen describes as establishing animal theology as an academic field.

Later work has developed animal theology in several directions. Michael J. Murray's Nature Red in Tooth and Claw: Theism and the Problem of Animal Suffering (2008) examines suffering among non-human animals as a problem for theism, considering proposed explanations involving the Fall, animal well-being, the regularity of natural laws and evolutionary processes. David L. Clough's two-volume On Animals (2012–2019) places animals within Christian systematic theology through the doctrines of creation, reconciliation and redemption.

Celia Deane-Drummond has examined the implications of evolutionary biology and animal behaviour for Christian theological anthropology. In The Wisdom of the Liminal: Evolution and Other Animals in Human Becoming (2014), she considers human distinctiveness in relation to animal cognition, agency, morality, language and social life. In All God's Animals: A Catholic Theological Framework for Animal Ethics (2019), Jesuit theologian Christopher W. Steck developed a Catholic theology of animals drawing on doctrines including creation, redemption, pneumatology and eschatology, and argued that the inclusion of animals in God's kingdom has implications for Christian treatment of them.

In 2020, the Graduate Theological Foundation appointed Clair Linzey as the Frances Power Cobbe Professor of Animal Theology, a chair named after the animal protection campaigner Frances Power Cobbe. The Oxford Centre for Animal Ethics described Linzey as the first professor of animal theology in the United States.

Clough later examined biblical accounts of animal life, human–animal relationships, redemption and human responsibilities towards other animals in his work on the Bible and animal theology. Clair Linzey's Developing Animal Theology: An Engagement with Leonardo Boff (2022) develops animal theology in dialogue with liberation theology and ecotheology and proposes a Trinitarian theology of animal liberation.

== See also ==
- Animal ethics
- Animal rights § In religion
- Animal rights in Indian religions
- Animals in Islam
- Animals in the Bible
- Christianity and animal rights
- Christian vegetarianism
- Tza'ar ba'alei chayim
- Religion and environmentalism
