= Etica & Animali =

Italian animal ethics journal (1988–1998)

- Cover of the first issue
- Discipline: Animal ethics
- Language: Italian
- Edited by: Paola Cavalieri

Publication details
- History: 1988–1998
- Publisher: Animus (Italy)
- Frequency: Irregular

Standard abbreviations
- ISO 4: Etica Anim.

Indexing
- OCLC no.: 807895824

Etica & Animali ("Ethics & Animals") was an Italian journal of animal ethics founded and edited by the philosopher Paola Cavalieri. Published in Milan by Animus from 1988 to 1998, it introduced Italian readers to analytic philosophy concerning animal ethics and writings on the animal liberation movement.

== History ==
Nine numbered issues of Etica & Animali appeared during its publication run. The first seven were published between 1988 and 1993, followed by issues in 1996 and 1998. The journal published previously unpublished work by Peter Singer, Tom Regan, Edward Johnson, James Rachels and other philosophers concerned with animal ethics.

In their account of Italian antispeciesism, Giorgio Losi and Niccolò Bertuzzi credit Cavalieri and the journal with helping popularise the concept of animals as holders of rights within the Italian animal advocacy movement, including among established organisations. Sociologist Fabien Carrié also identifies Etica & Animali as a source through which ideas from the animal liberation movement circulated.

The journal also influenced the development of animal ethics publications elsewhere in Europe. David Olivier, a founder of the French journal Cahiers antispécistes, later recalled that its establishment in 1991 had been partly inspired by Etica & Animali.

In 1996, the eighth issue was devoted to the Great Ape Project and jointly edited by Cavalieri and Singer. It included contributions in multiple languages. The ninth and final issue, published in 1998, concerned personhood in non-human animals.

== See also ==
- Between the Species
- Journal of Animal Ethics
- Relations. Beyond Anthropocentrism
