= Dogs in the American Revolutionary War =

Dogs played various roles during the time of the American Revolutionary War. In addition to formal uses like their role in hunting, dogs often accompanied their owners while they were fighting and provided comfort for their owners and those with them in camps. During this time, dogs were being newly studied in science and depicted in art.

== History ==
By 1775 at the start of the Revolutionary War, dogs were well established and part of the culture of the Thirteen Colonies. However, they were not always welcome. In 1772, the city leaders of Williamsburg passed legislation called the Act to Prevent Mischief from Dogs that forbade anyone to own a female dog in the city. Those living in Williamsburg were allowed to keep up to two male dogs, assuming they wore collars with their owners' initials. Dogs outside of these requirements were to be killed. In the eighteenth century, science was improving and expanding to include more research on animals. This new attention being paid to animals allowed people to think of dogs (and other animals) as having feelings and personalities like people. In 1776, an Anglican clergyman named Humphrey Primatt published A Dissertation on the Duty of Mercy and Sin of Cruelty to Brute Animals, a document often referred to as a Declaration of Independence for animals. Following the Enlightenment ideas about the merit of humanitarianism came an acceptance of humanitarian activities for animals. In addition, there was a growing popularity of fox hunting in both England and the colonies that created a need for hunting dogs. Dogs became more popular as pets "as scientific classification of species of plants [and] animals was growing." Dogs traditionally herded livestock, carried messages, guarded their owners, and carried packs for their owners in addition to retrieving game. During the Revolutionary War, they provided also comfort for their owners who were far from home. While fighting, both British and American soldiers adopted stray dogs and other animals as they traveled.

== George Washington's dogs ==
George Washington, the Commander-in-Chief of the Continental Army, was integral to the Revolutionary War. While at Mount Vernon, Washington inspected the dog kennels twice a day and visited with his hounds. He was an avid hunter and maintained kennels of foxhounds for this purpose. Though most of his dogs were used for hunting and breeding, he brought along his favorite dog, Sweet Lips, with him when he went to the First Continental Congress in 1774. During the winter months he went foxhunting a couple times a week. In addition to admiration for some of the dogs he kept for domestic purposes, like Sweet Lips, Venus, and True Love, Washington wrote about his rides with his foxhounds. After the War ended, Washington experimented in dog breeding. He sought to create a hunting dog that was fast, smart, and had a sharp nose. After General Marquis de Lafayette sent Washington a few of his favorite French hounds in 1785, Washington began including the French pups in his breeding experiments. The American Foxhound, a lighter, faster, smarter, and taller dog than its French or British cousin, sprouted from these experiments, resulting in Washington being known as the "father of the American Foxhound".

=== Returning General Howe's terrier ===
Like George Washington and many other commanders, General Sir William Howe, a British commander, kept dogs with him while he was in battle. During a surprise attack on the British at Germantown on October 4, 1777, Howe's Fox Terrier, Lila, was lost in the commotion and ended up joining the American Army as it withdrew from the battlefield back to its encampment. When Howe's dog found its way into Washington's headquarters marquee, Washington was alerted that the dog's collar had Howe's name engraved. Washington ordered that the terrier be returned to Howe and included a polite note.

== General Charles Lee's dogs and more ==
Continental Army Major General Charles Lee is remembered not only for his military accomplishments, but also for usually traveling with many dogs by his side. Lee was deeply attached to his dogs, and carried that reputation with him wherever he went. He is remembered for his eccentric love of dogs and for his Pomeranian, Spado (sometimes referred to as Spada). Lee wrote to George Washington on February 9, 1777, expressing how he missed his dogs while in New York. He said, "I am likewise extremely desirous that My Dogs should be brought as I never stood in greater need of their Company than at present." Spado was permitted to accompany his master while he was traveling for military campaigns. While in Halifax, Virginia, Lee is remembered for not allowing Spado "'to eat bacon for breakfast ... lest it make him stupid.'"

John Adams described Lee as a "queer creature" and suggested that "you must love his dogs if you love him". Adams was an owner of dogs as well. Abigail's favorite was named Juno, but their more well-remembered dog bore the name of Satan. One of Lee's contemporaries remembered Lee as a "great admirer of dogs". One story of Lee and his dogs involves Abigail Adams. At a party, Lee ordered his favorite dog and frequent companion, Spado, to climb on a chair and present his paw to Abigail Adams to shake. Abigail Adams, in a letter to her husband on December 10, 1775, recalled the event:

I was very politely entertaind and noticed by the Generals, more especially General Lee, who was very urgent with me to tarry in Town and dine with him and the Laidies present, at Hob Goblin Hall, but I excused my self. The General was determined that I should not only be acquainted with him, but with his companions too, and therefore placed a chair before me into which he orderd Mr. Sparder to mount and present his paw to me for a better acquaintance. I could not do otherways than accept it.—That Madam says he is the Dog which Mr ....has renderd famous.

== Baron von Steuben's dogs ==
Baron von Steuben, a Prussian and American military officer, served as inspector general and major general of the Continental Army and played a vital role in leading training and inspection tours for the Continental Army at Valley Forge. Steuben is remembered for many unconventionalities, but perhaps most frequently for his love of dogs. Azor, an Italian Greyhound and Steuben's favorite dog, traveled with the Baron wherever he went throughout the war. Azor's name and stories of his relationship with the Baron can be found in many accounts of those who interacted with Steuben during his time with the Continental Army. Peter S. Duponceau, Steuben's Private Secretary and Aide-de-camp, described Azor in one of his accounts of Steuben's time in Boston as "a large, spoiled Italian dog".

Dogs Depicted in Art

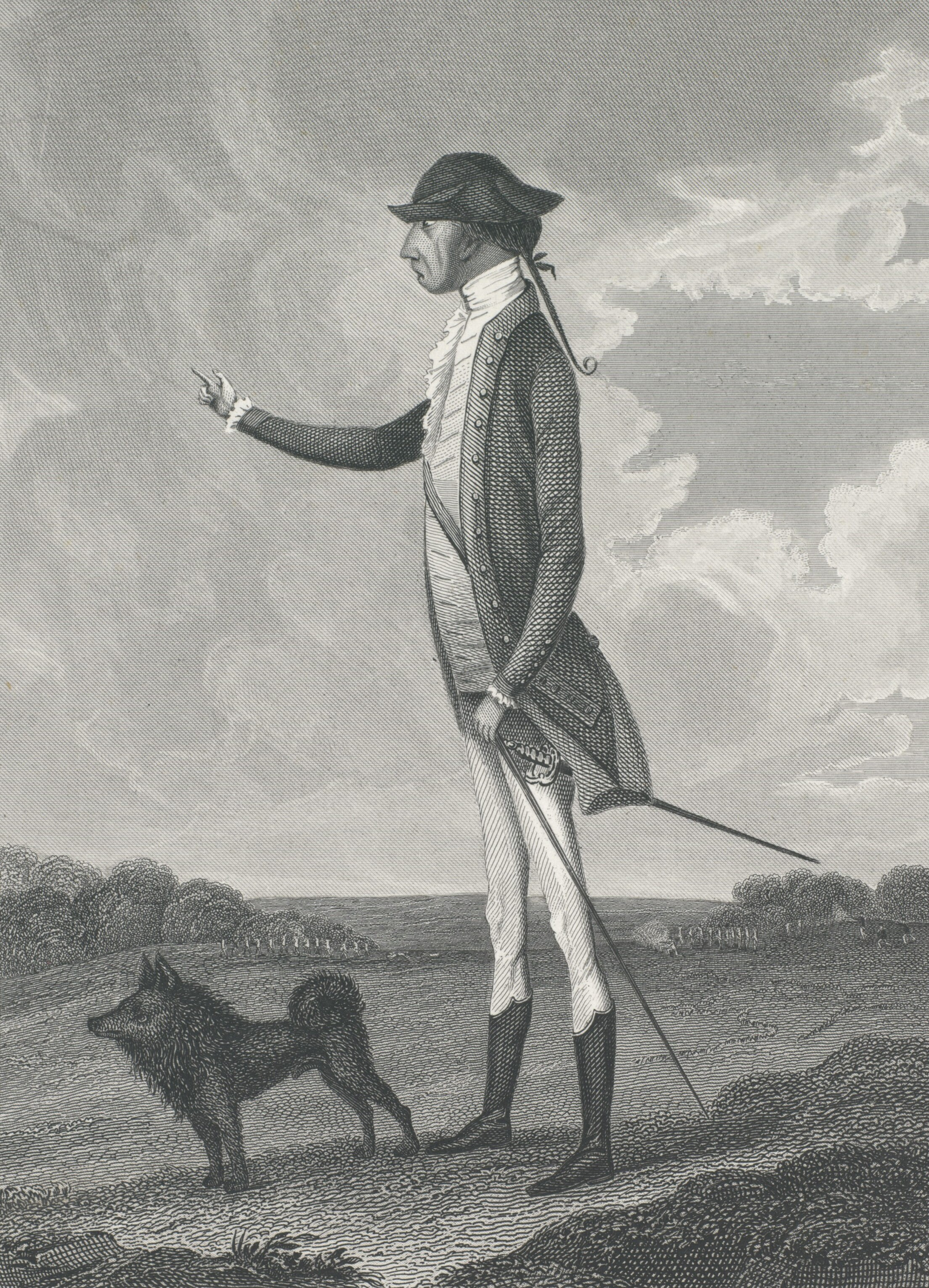
Major General Charles Lee, Alexander Hay Ritchie, 1840–1895, Metropolitan Museum of Art

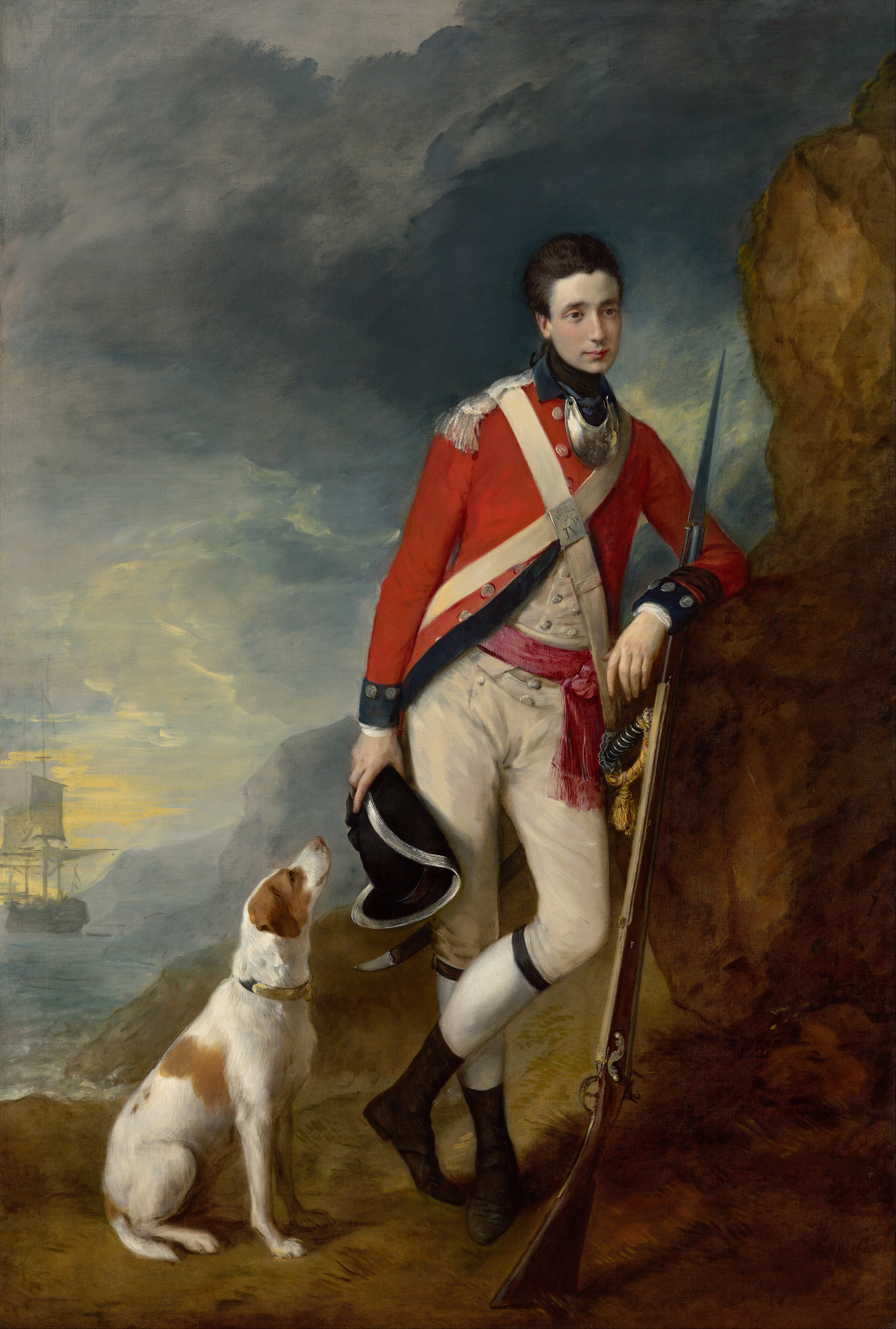
An officer of the 4th Regiment of Foot, Thomas Gainsborough, 1776, National Gallery of Victoria

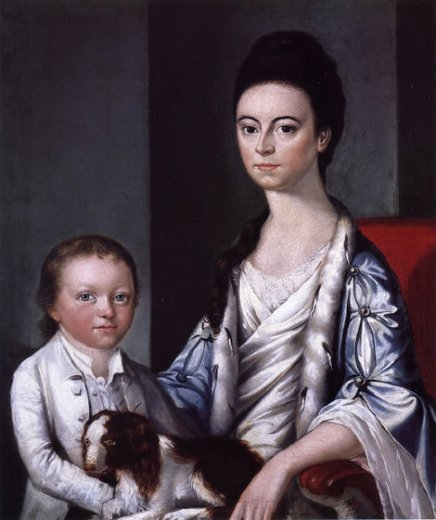
Christian Stelle Banister and Her Son John, Gilbert Stuart, 1773, Redwood Library and Atbenaeum, Newport

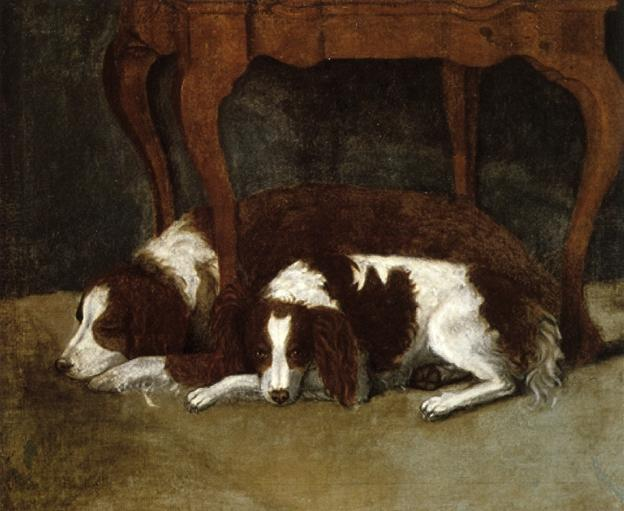
The Hunter Dogs, Gilbert Stuart, 1769, Preservation Society of Newport County

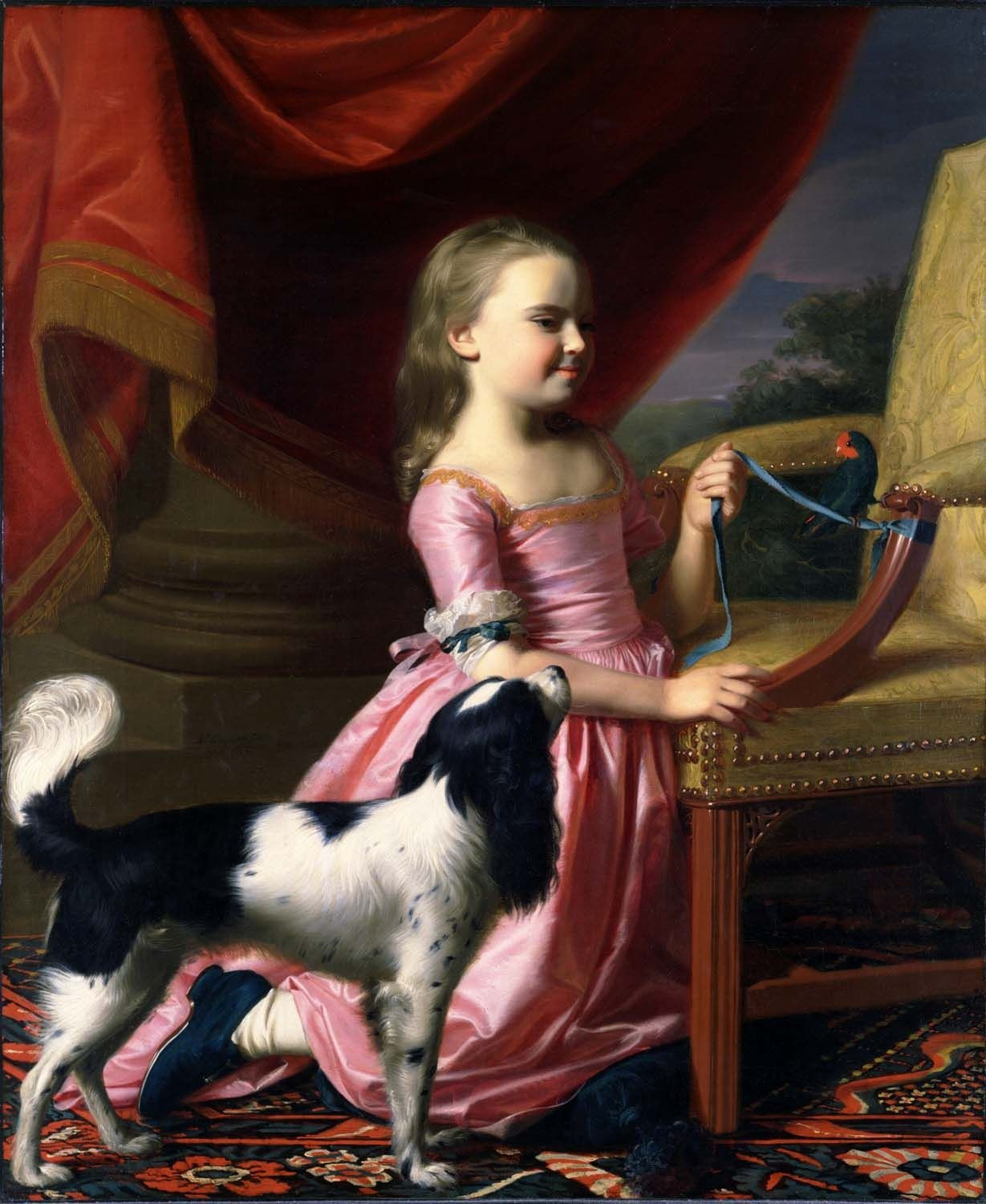
Young Lady with a Bird and Dog, John Singleton Copley, 1767, Toledo Museum of Art

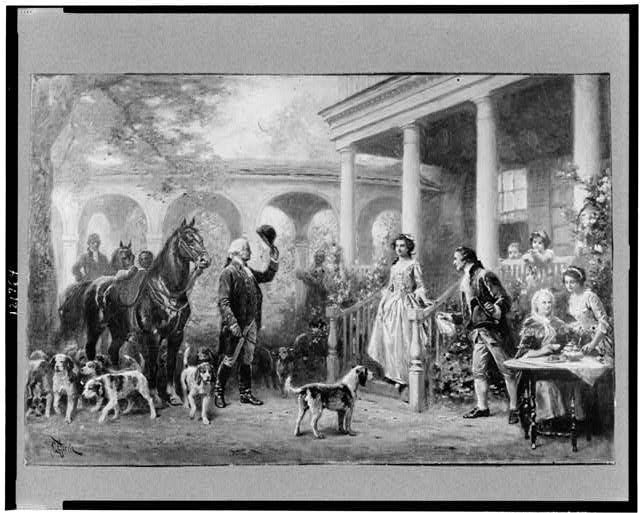
The Return from the Hunt, J.L.G. Ferris, c. 1910, Library of Congress Prints and Photographs Division

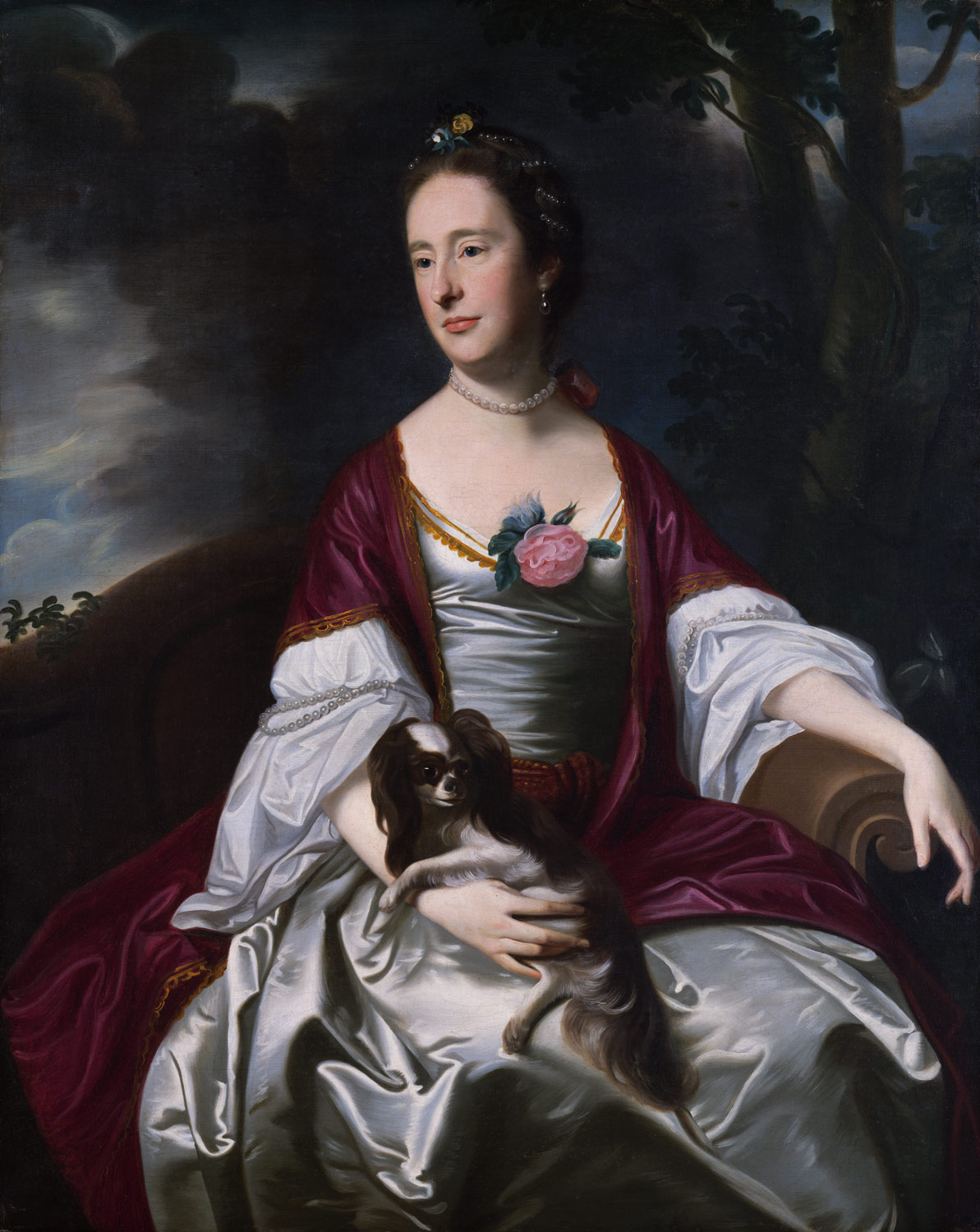
Mrs. Jerathmael Bowers, John Singleton Copley, 1763, The Metropolitan Museum of Art

== See also ==
- List of individual dogs
