= Animal Theology (book) =

1994 book by Andrew Linzey

- First edition cover
- Author: Andrew Linzey
- Language: English
- Subject: Animal theology; Christian theology; Christian ethics; Animal ethics; Animal rights
- Publisher: SCM Press
- Publication date: 1994
- Publication place: United Kingdom
- Pages: x + 214
- ISBN: 978-0-334-00005-1
- OCLC: 30786047

Animal Theology is a 1994 book by the English theologian Andrew Linzey, published by SCM Press. In the book, Linzey develops his account of animal theology, presenting a Christian theological case for the moral consideration of animals and criticising anthropocentrism in Christian thought. He discusses animals in relation to creation, human responsibility, Christian ethics, and the idea that animals possess intrinsic value independently of their usefulness to humans.

The book combines theological argument with discussion of practical issues including animal experimentation, hunting, vegetarianism, and genetic engineering. It has been discussed in relation to animal rights, biblical interpretation, and Christian moral theology. Reviewers have praised its contribution to Christian discussion of animals while criticising aspects of its biblical interpretation and its positions on animal use.

== Summary ==
The book has two sections. The first section sets out Linzey's theological argument about animals, creation, and human responsibility. Linzey discusses the intrinsic value of creation and criticises approaches that he regards as overly anthropocentric, including aspects of the thought of Karl Barth and Thomas Aquinas. He also discusses Albert Schweitzer's idea of reverence for life, and argues for a theocentric account in which animals are valued as part of God's creation.

The second section discusses ethical issues involving animals, including animal experimentation, hunting, vegetarianism, and genetic engineering. Linzey considers these practices in relation to Christian ideas including mercy, stewardship, and justice. He argues that human beings should relate to animals through care and service rather than exploitation.

== Publication history ==
Animal Theology was first published by SCM Press in London in 1994. It has been translated into French, Spanish, Italian, Polish, Hungarian, Croatian, and Japanese. A Portuguese translation was published in 2026.

== Reception ==
The American philosopher Daniel Dombrowski described the book as introducing Linzey's "generosity paradigm", which he said was a concept that Christianity could contribute to the animal rights debate.

Bronislaw Szerszynski criticised Linzey's position on "animal experiments, hunting, meat-eating and genetic engineering", summarising it with the phrase "don't do it" and describing it as "too absolutist" for not addressing the complexities of the modern moral landscape.

Linzey's book was reviewed from three perspectives in the Baptist theological journal Review & Expositor: theological, Old Testament, and New Testament. Sally Smith Holt described Animal Theology as a "worthwhile endeavor in Christian scholarship", but said that it would "not convince all Christians to become vegetarians". Mark McEntire argued that the Old Testament does not provide enough support for Linzey's generosity ethic. David D. May wrote that Linzey's rejection of parts of the New Testament was a form of special pleading, stating that it did not do justice to passages that were problematic for animal theology.

== See also ==
- Animals in the Bible
- Christianity and animal rights
- Christian vegetarianism
