= Arthur Schopenhauer's view on animal rights =

Philosophical thought

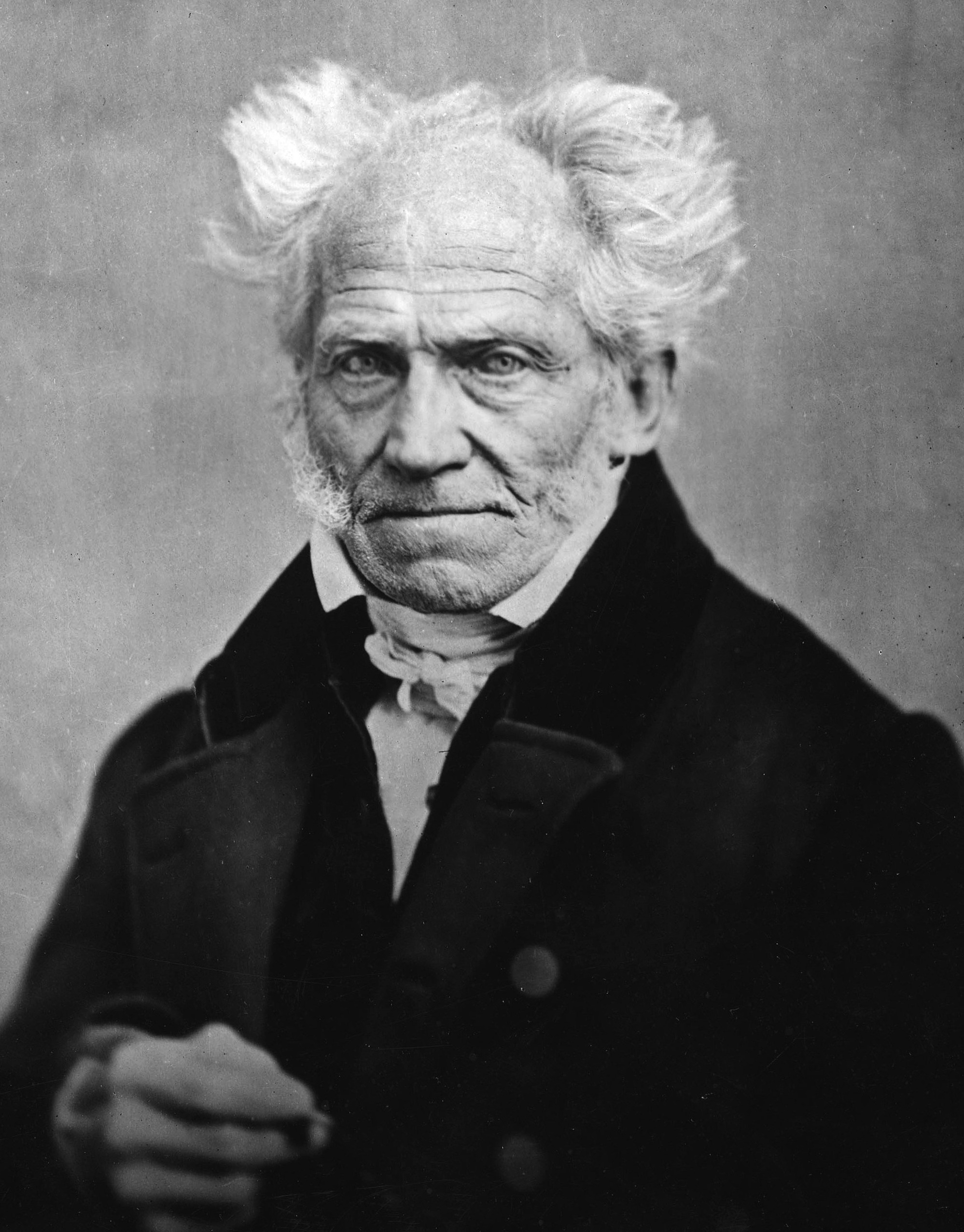
Arthur Schopenhauer was an early defender of animal rights.

Arthur Schopenhauer was a 19th-century German philosopher. He was an early defender of animal rights, going against the prevailing idea at the time that animals had no rights and only had instrumental value to humans. According to Schopenhauer, "The assumption that animals are without rights and the illusion that our treatment of them has no moral significance is a positively outrageous example of Western crudity and barbarity. Universal compassion is the only guarantee of morality.". Schopenhauer argued that animals should be treated with respect and compassion, as they, like humans, are subjected to the metaphysical will, and experience suffering and craving as a result.

== Background ==
Animals have been supposed to have lesser rights than humans from the beginning of history, with a few exceptions in some philosophical and religious traditions. Arthur Schopenhauer, having been influenced by the philosophical school of thought of Buddhism, came to the conclusion that animals are subjected to a form of metaphysical Will and that they are therefore subject to suffering and craving.

== Influence of Buddhism ==
Buddhism had a deep influence on Schopenhauer's philosophy

Arthur Schopenhauer, who had been strongly influenced by the Buddhist tradition in his philosophy of the Will, would argue thereafter that animals do have rights that should be respected, as they are beings driven by craving and subject to The Will. Schopenhauer says that due to The Will contained in animals, they should be treated kindly, as there is not only an ethical component involved but even a person's character is altered by how he treats non-human animals. According to Schopenhauer: "Since compassion for animals is so intimately associated with goodness of character, it may be confidently asserted that whoever is cruel to animals cannot be a good man", and finally, that "Universal compassion is the only guarantee of morality", echoing Buddhist views on animal ethics; however, Schopenhauer did not openly advocate for vegetarianism. Due to how similar his beliefs were to Buddhist philosophy, Schopenhauer has often been referred to as "The First European Buddhist".

== Influence of Hinduism ==
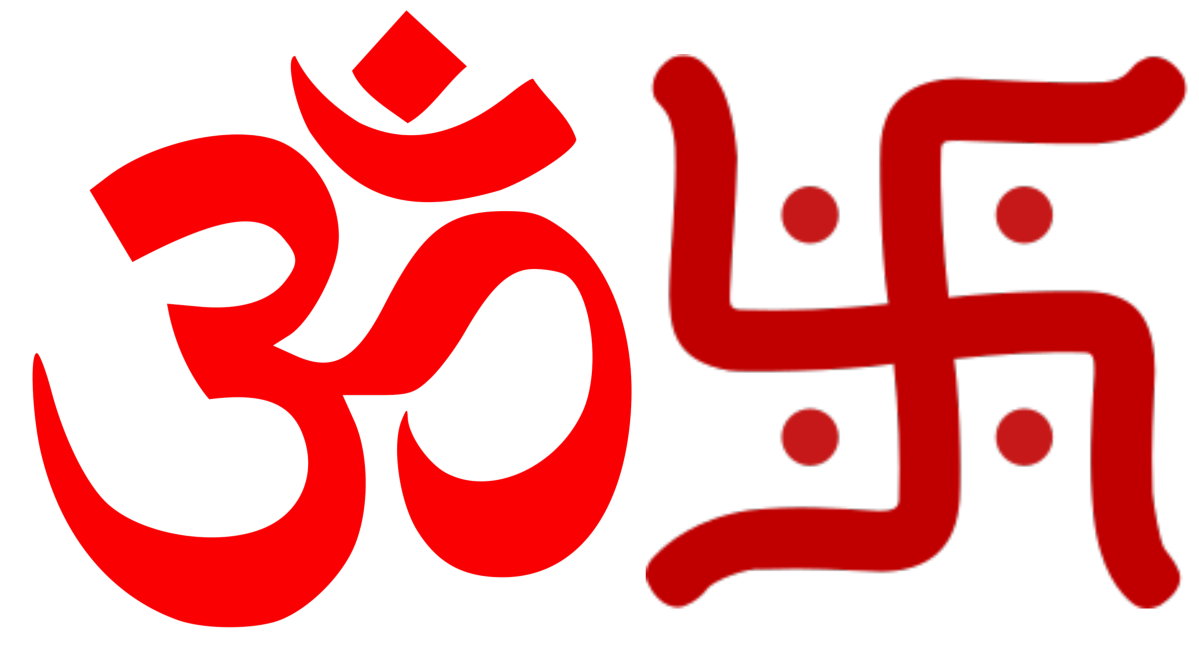
Schopenhauer's philosophy was influenced by Hinduism, which preached for a fairer treatment of animals

Schopenhauer had a profound interest in studying the Hindu philosophies, which held that animals should be treated with a minimum of respect. His poodle dogs, of which Schopenhauer was fond, were named "Atman", in reference to the Sanskrit word "Atman", which means "Self" or "soul". Schopenhauer believed that, since animals have a Will similar to that humans do, it is pertinent that they be treated with compassion. According to Schopenhauer, the ethical treatment of animals was not only of ethical importance but important to the creation of good character.

== Criticism of Christianity's view on animals ==
According to Schopenhauer, the traditional Christian view on the rights of animals is eschewed, as it presupposes that man has a righteous superiority in comparison to non-human animals, being allowed to use them as they so wish. Schopenhauer says the fact that Christian morality handles animals as mere "things", that is, as a means, constitutes an immoral aspect of Christian philosophy. Schopenhauer would say that not recognizing the existence of the Will contained in animals is a faulty aspect of Christian thought. For Schopenhauer, the Christian idea that man has an absolute right to authority over all other animals should be considered an error.

== Schopenhauer's poodle ==
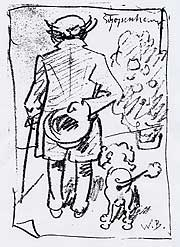
Arthur Schopenhauer with his poodle by Willhelm Busch

It was said that, during his later life, Arthur Schopenhauer preferred to live in solitude, with the exception of his pet dogs, all of which were purportedly poodles. It was said that his company of animals had been an influential factor in the development of his view on animal rights. All of his dogs were supposedly named "Atman", as in reflecting the sanskrit word for "true self", used in reference to the concept of the Atman from Hindu philosophy. It was said that Schopenhauer, naturally having a misanthropic aversion to people, would rather spend his time with walks with his poodle. He gained some notoriety as a mostly lonesome man who kept only the company of his dogs during old age, taking walks with them often, having once written: "whoever has never kept dogs does not know what it is to love and be loved".

== Approval of eating animals ==
Based on his metaphysical system, Schopenhauer claimed that humans are in need of animals for sustenance. Furthermore, he thought that the capacity to suffer is strictly linked with intelligence, which means that humans would suffer more by abstaining from eating animals than animals would suffer from being killed for food.
