= Mark Bernstein =

Mark Bernstein may refer to:

- Mark Bernstein (University of Michigan), member of the University of Michigan Board of Regents
- Mark H. Bernstein (born 1948), American philosopher
- Mark Bernstein (publisher), hypertext literature publisher
- Mark Izraylevich Bernstein (born 1965), Wikipedia editor based in Belarus, detained in 2022
