= Animals in Buddhism =

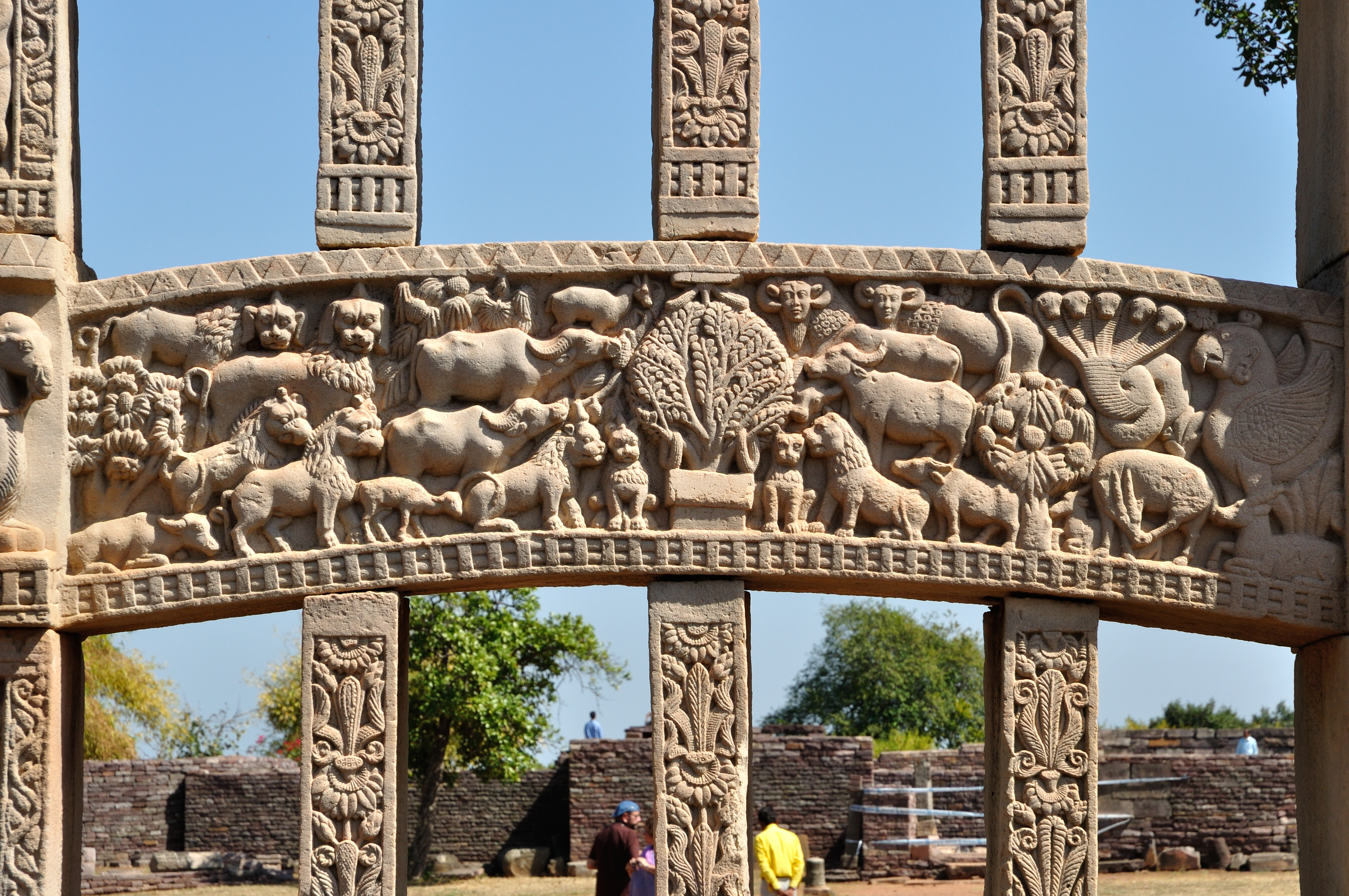
The Buddha, represented by the Bodhi tree, attended by animals, Sanchi vihara

The position and treatment of animals in Buddhism is important for the light it sheds on Buddhists' perception of their own relation to the natural world, on Buddhist humanitarian concerns in general, and on the relationship between Buddhist theory and Buddhist practice.

== Etymology ==
In the Pali language, the translation is Tira-acchanā. Tira means against and Acchanā means a being that can move. Hence, the full meaning is a being that moves horizontally unlike the humans, Deva and Brahmā.

== In Buddhist doctrine ==
Animals have always been regarded in Buddhist thought as sentient beings. The doctrine of rebirth held that any human could be reborn as animal, and any animal could be reborn as a human. An animal might be a reborn dead relative, and anybody who looked far enough back through their series of lives might come to believe every animal to be a distant relative. The Buddha expounded that sentient beings currently living in the animal realm have been our mothers, brothers, sisters, fathers, children, friends in past rebirths. Therefore, one could not make a hard distinction between moral rules applicable to animals and those applicable to humans; ultimately humans and animals were part of a single family, they are all interconnected.

In cosmological terms, the animals were believed to inhabit a distinct "world", separated from humans not by space but by state of mind. This world was called Tiryagyoni in Sanskrit, Tiracchānayoni in Pāli. Rebirth as an animal was considered to be one of the unhappy rebirths, usually involving more than human suffering. Buddhist commentarial texts depict many sufferings associated with the animal world; even where human beings are not present, they are attacked and eaten by other animals or live in fear of it, they endure extreme changes of environment throughout the year, and they have no security of habitation. Those that live among humans are often slaughtered for their bodies, or taken and forced to work with many beatings until they are slaughtered at the end of their lives. On top of this, they suffer from ignorance, not knowing or understanding with any clarity what is happening to them and unable to do much about it, acting primarily on instinct.

The Chinese scholar Zhiyi taught the principle of the Mutual Possession of the Ten Worlds. This meant that all living beings have buddha-nature 'in their present form'. In the 'Devadatta chapter of the Lotus Sutra the Dragon King's Daughter attains Buddhahood in her present form, thus opening the way for both women and animals to attain Buddhahood.

== In the Jatakas ==
The Jātaka stories which tell of past lives of the Buddha in folktale fashion, frequently involve animals as peripheral or main characters, and it is not uncommon for the Bodhisattva (the past-life Buddha) to appear as an animal as well. The stories sometimes involve animals alone, and sometimes involve conflicts between humans and animals; in the latter cases, the animals often exhibit characteristics of kindness and generosity that are absent in the humans.

Also recorded in the Jatakas is how, in a past life as King Shibi, Shakyamuni sacrificed himself to save a dove from a hawk. Recorded in the Golden Light Sutra, is how Shakyamuni in a past life, as Prince Sattva, came across a starving tigress and her cubs, he fed himself to them so that they would survive.

== Behaviour regarding animals ==
The first of the five precepts bans the taking of life. The interpretation (in all traditions excluding Tibetan Buddhism, which interprets the precept as equivalent to the rule found in the pratimoksa) is that it applies to all sentient beings, which includes those in the animal realm in its broadest sense, i.e., not just mammals, but all animal taxa including insects and other invertebrates. From the beginnings of Buddhism, there were regulations intended to prevent the harming of sentient beings in the animal realm for various reasons.

The Buddha taught that from infinite rebirths, all animals have been our past relatives, sisters, mothers, brothers, fathers and children. Therefore, in Mahayana Buddhism, it is against the first precept to harm, kill or eat sentient beings as it is the same as harming, killing or eating the flesh of our own child or mother. Monks were forbidden from intentionally killing an animal, or drinking water with living creatures (such as larvae) in it.

Concern for animals is attested back to the beginnings of Buddhist history. The first Buddhist monarch of India, Ashoka, includes in his Edicts an expression of concern for the number of animals that had been killed for his meals, and expresses an intention to put an end to this killing. He also includes animals with humans as the beneficiaries of his programs for obtaining medicinal plants, planting trees and digging wells. In his fifth Pillar Edict, Ashoka decrees the protection of a large number of animals that were not in common use as livestock; protects from slaughter young animals and mother animals still milking their young; protects forests from being burned, expressly to protect the animals living in them; and bans a number of other practices hurtful to animals. In this Ashoka was carrying out the advice to the Cakravartin king given in the Cakkavattisīhanāda-sutta (DN.26) that a good king should extend his protection not merely to different classes of people equally, but also to beasts and birds.

A controversial case in Yulin, China involved 700 rescued dogs being denied life-saving injections and medical treatment at a Buddhist sanctuary. As a result, many of the already sick animals died of distemper and other diseases within days.

== Vegetarianism ==
A basic precept in Buddhism is that of non-harm. Actions which result in the taking of life, directly or indirectly, contradict this basic Buddhist precept.

Many Buddhists in many countries, including monks, are not vegetarians. In recent years, however, some people's attitudes are changing. In December 2007, the 17th Karmapa, Ogyen Trinley Dorje (The identification of the 17th Karmapa is disputed, see Karmapa controversy), reflected on the subject:

Last year on the final day of the Kagyu Monlam, I said a few things on the subject of giving up eating meat. Almost all of you probably already know this. It seems some people did not completely understand what I said. For example, some foreign students seemed to think it meant that once you become a student of the Kagyu, meat is not allowed to pass your lips. They told all the meat-eating Kagyupas, "You can't be a Kagyupa if you eat meat." I did not say anything that inflammatory. If a Mahayana practitioner, who considers all sentient beings to be like their father or mother, eats the flesh of another being out of carelessness and without any compassion, that is not good. So we need to think about this and pay attention to it. All of us Mahayana practitioners, who accept that all sentient beings have been our mothers and fathers, need to think about this. For that reason, it would be good to decrease the amount of meat that we eat. That is what I said.

I certainly did not say that you are not allowed to eat meat at all. That would be difficult. Whether it is because of previous karma or their present circumstances, some people cannot do without meat. This is how it is, and there's nothing to do about it. It's not a problem.

There has been some contention about interpretations of the sūtras. One interpretation is that eating of meat is not explicitly prohibited in the suttas and Vinaya of the Pāli canon which encourage monks to accept whatever food they are given. However, monks are forbidden from accepting animal flesh if they know, believe or suspect that the animal in question was killed especially for them, i.e., if the visits of begging monks have become an occasion for the slaughter of animals. This is known as the "triple-clean meat" (三淨肉).

In the earlier Mahāyāna Śūraṅgama Sūtra, the three clean meats have been given the addition of naturally-dead animals and scraps from predation by other animals to make the "five clean meats". Mahāyāna Mahāparinirvāṇa Sūtra mentions the concept of nine clean meats without endorsing.

In the Mahāyāna Laṅkāvatāra and Aṅgulimāla sutras, the Buddha explicitly prohibits the eating of meat, fish and any animal products which are the result of harming and killing of any sentient being. The Buddha states the only time it is acceptable for a monastic to accept and eat the flesh of sentient beings is for medicinal purposes only if the animal died in accordance with the Dharma, meaning the animal died of natural causes.

In post-Emperor Wu of Liang Mahāyāna Chinese Buddhism and in those countries to which post-Liang Chinese Buddhism has spread (such as Korea, Vietnam), Buddhist monks are more strictly vegetarian. One of the scriptural sources for this prohibition is the Mahāyāna Laṅkāvatāra Sūtra. This sūtra condemns meat-eating in the strongest terms; among several other reasons, it is stated that it should be avoided because the presence of a meat-eater causes terror in animals, who believe them to be likely to kill them.

Although vegetarianism is not expressly commanded in the Pāli canon, it is evidently viewed as an ideal state from which human beings have fallen; the Aggañña Sutta (DN.27) explains how human beings, originally sustained on various kinds of vegetable matter (compare Gen.1:29-30), as the result of increasing wickedness began to live by hunting, which was originally thought of as a demeaning occupation.

== Release of animals ==
In East Asian Buddhism and particularly in Tibet and China, the release of animals, particularly birds or fish, into their natural environment became an important way of demonstrating Buddhist pity. In Tibetan Buddhism it is known as Tsethar; whilst in China it was known as 放生 (Fàngshēng). This practice is based on a passage in the Mahāyāna Sūtra of Brahma's Net (Ch: Fanwang Jing), which states that "...all the beings in the six paths of existence are my parents. If I should kill and eat them, it is the same as killing my own parents. ... Since to be reborn into one existence after another is the permanent and unalterable law, we should teach people to release sentient beings." In the later Ming dynasty, societies "for releasing life" were created, which built ponds in which to release fish that were redeemed from fishermen for this purpose. They also bought other animals which were sold in the markets and released them.

It is increasingly recognized that animal release has the potential for negative environmental impacts, including as a pathway for the introduction of invasive species into non-native environments. This may lead to biodiversity loss over time. Further, some animals are captured for the explicit purpose of being released.

== See also ==
- Animal rights in Jainism, Hinduism, and Buddhism
- Animal sacrifice
- Animal welfare
- Tiger Temple
- Zoology
