= Animal rights in Indian religions =

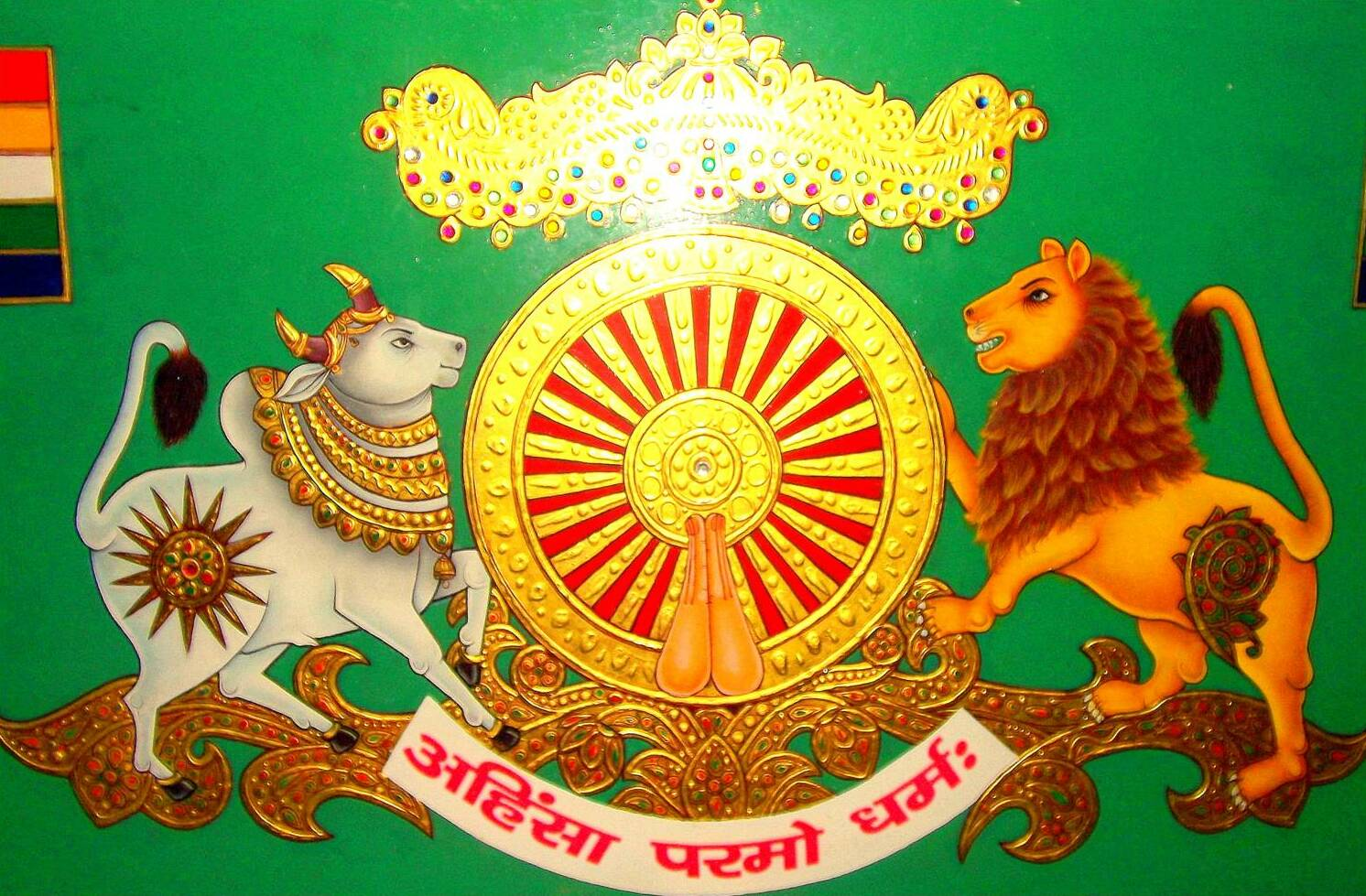
This painting in a Jain temple features a religious teaching in Sanskrit: अहिंसा परमो धर्मः, romanized: ahimsā paramo dharmah, lit. 'non-violence is the highest dharma.'.

The respect for animal rights in Jainism, Hinduism, and Buddhism derives from the doctrine of ahimsa.

In Hinduism, animals contain a soul just like humans; when sentient beings die, they can either be reincarnated as a human or as an animal.

These beliefs have resulted in many Hindus practicing vegetarianism, while Jain doctrine mandates vegetarianism based on its strict interpretation of the doctrine of ahimsa. Mahayana Buddhists similarly practice vegetarianism and Mahayana Buddhism prohibits the killing of animals.

== Jainism ==
Almost every Jain community in India has established animal hospitals to care for injured and abandoned animals. Many Jains also rescue animals from slaughterhouses.

== Hinduism ==
Hinduism teaches that a part of God resides in all living things, which forms the atman. As such, reverence and respect for animals is taught.

In Hinduism, many animals are venerated, including the tiger, the elephant, the mouse, and especially, the cow.

Mahatma Gandhi is noted for his compassion to all living things; he advocated against animal experimentation and animal cruelty.

== Mahayana Buddhism ==
Mahayana Buddhism teaches that "we can only escape our own suffering if we avoid inflicting it on others." Mahayana Buddhists practice vegetarianism to this end.

== See also ==
- Animal theology
- Animals in Islam
- Christianity and animal rights
- Christian vegetarianism
