= Between the Species =

American animal ethics journal

- The journal's logo, designed by Mary Starin
- Discipline: Animal ethics
- Language: English
- Edited by: Joseph Lynch

Publication details
- Former names: Between the Species: A Journal of Ethics; Between the Species: An Online Journal for the Study of Philosophy and Animals
- History: 1985–1996; 2002–present
- Publisher: Philosophy Department and Digital Commons at the California Polytechnic State University (United States)
- Frequency: Annual
- Open access: Yes

Standard abbreviations
- ISO 4: Between Species

Indexing
- ISSN: 1945-8487
- LCCN: HV4702
- OCLC no.: 812132348

Links
- Journal homepage

Between the Species: A Journal for the Study of Philosophy and Animals (Note: Formerly Between the Species: A Journal of Ethics and Between the Species: An Online Journal for the Study of Philosophy and Animals) (BTS) is a peer-reviewed academic journal devoted to animal ethics. It is, in part, a continuation of Ethics & Animals (E&A), a journal which ran from 1980 to 1984. Between the Species was founded as a print journal in 1985, published by the Schweitzer Center of the San Francisco Bay Institute/Congress of Cultures. The print version ceased publication in 1996. It was revived as an open access online-only journal in 2002. It is published by the Philosophy Department and Digital Commons at the California Polytechnic State University; Joseph Lynch is the current editor-in-chief.

== History ==
=== Print ===
Between the Species is the name of a fictional journal mentioned in Negavit, a novel by George Abbe. A real-world journal by the name was first published from 1971 to 1972. This had a small distribution not extending beyond the United States, and most of its contents were works by Abbe. The journal was revived, "in modified form", in 1985, with the publication of volume 1, issue 1 of Between the Species, a quarterly scholarly journal of philosophy, also featuring interviews, artwork of various forms, and autobiographies. The journal was published by the Schweitzer Center of the San Francisco Bay Institute/Congress of Cultures with funding from the Animal Protection Institute, and was initially edited by Abbe, Steve F. Sapontzis and John Stockwell. In its early years, the journal had financial problems and issues were often released late. The editors were responsible for much of the production, which was done by hand: Stockwell explained that "In late 1984 [Sapontzis] bought a new ball for his dot-matrix printer, and dedicated part of his sabbatical year to typing out the articles that would appear in BTS. These he would print out in three inch wide continuous columns, which I would then cut with scissors and strip into pages, afterwards adding the graphics and titles." The journal was primarily distributed to readers who were themselves a part of the animal rights movement.

Between the Species is partially a continuation of a journal named Ethics & Animals. The latter publication was established in 1980 as the journal for the Society of the Study of Ethics and Animals and was edited by Harlan B. Miller, with Jeanne Keister and Suzie J. Vankrey serving as managing editors. The journal was quarterly, and ceased publication in 1984 with issue 4 of volume 5. In his final editorial, Miller noted that mainstream philosophical journals would potentially publish ethical work on animals, and noted that readers of Ethics & Animals were specifically invited to submit manuscripts to Between the Species. The Society for the Study of Ethics and Animals says that Ethics & Animals "evolved into" Between the Species, though Between the Species is not published by the society.

Negavit, unpublished at the time of the establishment of Between the Species, began to be serialized in the third issue. The Humane Society of the United States partially funded the second volume, and the third volume received financial support from a number of "sustainers". The journal's financial difficulties were partially alleviated by a grant received from the Ahimsa Foundation prior to the publication of volume 4; this allowed the journal's expansion to 80 pages per issue. Issue 3 of volume 4 was the first issue to have professional typesetting; issues were shortened to 60 pages, but this nonetheless allowed considerably greater inclusion than the 52-page issues of volumes 1–3. Abbe died on March 15, 1989; the second issue of volume 5 was dedicated in his memory. The print journal stopped publishing in 1996 with a double issue comprising volume 12. In 2016, the philosopher Paola Cavalieri described the initial iteration of Between the Species as "pioneering".

=== Online ===
Between the Species returned as an online-only publication in 2001, with the first issue (labelled issue 2) published in 2002; all issues published between 2002 and 2010 make up volume 13, after which it switched to single-issue volumes. The online version adopted the new name Between the Species: An Online Journal for the Study of Philosophy and Animals, and in 2010 an archive of the print journal was made available online. Volumes 15 and 16, published in 2012 and 2013 respectively, were the journal's first special issues, publishing peer-reviewed versions of selected papers from two interdisciplinary conferences in animal studies. Volume 17, published in 2014, included the online iteration's first interview. 2018's volume 21 was a special issue dedicated in memory of Tom Regan, who died in 2017. As of 2023, the editor-in-chief is Joseph Lynch.

== Related journals ==
Between the Species is one of several journals that emerged in conjunction with the rise of the field of human-animal studies; others include Anthrozoös and Society & Animals. In a 2018 article, the organisation Animal Ethics describes Between the Species as a "well-known journal in animal ethics and animal philosophy"; other English-language journals focused on philosophy and animals that the organisation identifies are the Journal of Animal Ethics, the Journal of Applied Animal Ethics Research, Relations. Beyond Anthropocentrism, and Politics and Animals. The more general Journal of Agricultural and Environmental Ethics and the defunct Ethics and Animals are also identified.
