= José Ferrater Mora =

Catalan philosopher, essayist and writer

- Josep Ferrater i Mora
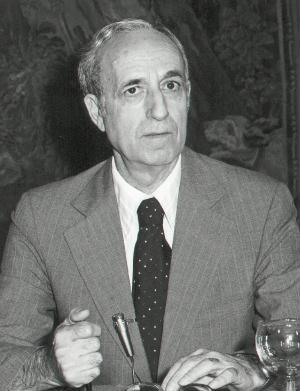
- Born: José María Ferrater Mora; 30 October 1912; Barcelona, Spain
- Died: 30 January 1991 (aged 78); Barcelona, Spain
- Spouse: Priscilla Cohn (m. 1980)

Education
- Education: University of Barcelona (Licenciatura, 1936)
- Academic advisor: Joaquim Xirau

Philosophical work
- Era: Contemporary philosophy
- Region: Western philosophy
- School: Analytic philosophy
- Institutions: University of Chile; Bryn Mawr College
- Doctoral students: Priscilla Cohn; Shaun Gallagher
- Notable students: Javier Muguerza
- Main interests: Applied ethics, animal ethics, metaphysics
- Notable works: Diccionario de filosofía El ser y la muerte De la materia a la razón
- Notable ideas: Integrationism, monism sui generis

José María Ferrater Mora (Catalan: Josep Ferrater i Mora; 30 October 1912 – 30 January 1991) was a Spanish philosopher, essayist and writer. He is considered the most prominent Catalan philosopher of the 20th-century and was the author of over 35 books, including a four-volume Diccionario de filosofía (Dictionary of Philosophy, 1941) and Being and Death: An Outline of Integrationist Philosophy (1962). Subjects he worked on include ontology, history of philosophy, metaphysics, anthropology, the philosophy of history and culture, epistemology, logic, philosophy of science, and ethics. He also directed several films.

Ferrater Mora was known for his inclusion of humans and non-human animals within the same moral sphere, or continuum, arguing that the difference was one of degree, not kind.

== Biography ==
Ferrater Mora was born in 1912 in Barcelona, Spain. He studied at Santa Maria del Collell, then at the University of Barcelona, where he earned a BA in 1932 and his BPhil in 1936.

During the Spanish Civil War, he enlisted in the Republican Army, serving as an intelligence clerk, before escaping the country in 1939. In exile, he spent three months in Paris, before moving to and lecturing in Havana, Cuba, and Santiago, Chile.

After receiving a Guggenheim Fellowship, he moved to the United States, first residing in New York City. In 1949, Ferrater Mora was hired by Bryn Mawr College to teach philosophy and Spanish literature, where he worked till his retirement in 1981. He married Priscilla Cohn (his former doctoral student) in 1980.

Ferrater Mora died from a heart attack, on 30 January 1991, while visiting Barcelona.

== Philosophy ==
Ferrater Mora is the creator of a philosophical method he called integrationism, with which he sought to integrate opposite systems of thought. He argued that irreducible concepts, which are the source of many disputes and divisions in philosophy, do not denote existing realities in themselves but are "limit concepts"; that is to say, these "opposite poles" do not exist absolutely. They exist only as trends or directions of reality and therefore are complementary and are useful to talk about it.

His philosophical work also focused on questions of an ontological nature. He called his ontological position "monism sui generis", since it unites monism and pluralism; it is an emergentism in which the elements assemble themselves by virtue of their properties or functions, or properties-functions. Each structure, although it depends on the elements that compose it, is not reducible to them because it acquires new properties-functions that cannot be explained based on those of the elements. The structure also becomes an element for a new structure. Self-assembly begins from the physical level to the point where structures acquire more complex properties, functions, and of a different order to give rise to a new biological level, and thus the continuum progresses until reaching the social and then the cultural level. It is a continuum that does not break and that goes from matter to reason.

He was one of the first philosophers to introduce applied ethics to the Spanish-speaking world and was a staunch supporter of animal rights.

His works combine a wide variety of influences, including the Spanish philosophers Miguel de Unamuno, Eugenio d'Ors and José Ortega y Gasset and numerous other representatives of both continental and analytic philosophy.

== Legacy ==
In January 1991, Ferrater Mora made public the decision to donate his personal library to the University of Girona. The collection consists of 7,255 books, 156 journal titles and correspondence, with 6,748 letters. The correspondence includes letters between Ferrater Mora and his friends, politicians and intellectuals of the time. This collection also includes letters from his departure into exile in the 1940s (Cuba, Chile and the United States), until his death in 1991. Other documents of interest include related writings, with politics and culture sent by personalities of the time: Xavier Benguerel, Enrique Tierno Galván, Néstor Almendros and Josep Trueta, among many others.

Founded in 1989, the Ferrater Mora Chair in Contemporary Thought regularly organizes seminars and lessons on contemporary philosophy.

The Ferrater Mora Oxford Centre for Animal Ethics is named in his honour.

== Awards ==
- Ferrater Mora received honorary degrees from the following universities: the Autonomous University of Barcelona (Spain, 1979), the University of the Republic (Uruguay, 1983), the National University of Tucumán (Argentina, 1983), the National University of Colombia (1983), the National University of Distance Education (Spain, 1986), the National University of Salta (Argentina, 1986), the National University of Cuyo (Argentina, 1988), the University of Barcelona (1988) and the University of Santiago de Compostela (posthumous; Spain, 1991).
- In 1982, he was awarded the Cross of the Order of Isabella the Catholic.
- In 1984, he was awarded the Creu de Sant Jordi of the Generalitat de Catalunya and the Grand Cross of the Civil Order of Alfonso X, the Wise.
- In 1985, he was awarded the Prince of Asturias Award for Communication and Humanities.
- In addition to being a numerus clausus member of the International Institute of Philosophy and various academic societies, he belonged to the North American Academy of the Spanish Language.

== Selected works ==
The following works are in Spanish, unless otherwise noted:

- Dictionary of Philosophy (Mexico: Atlante, 1941)
- Spain and Europe (Santiago de Chile: Cruz del Sur, 1942)
- The Forms of Catalan Life (Santiago de Chile: Agrupació Patriòtica Catalana, 1944), in Catalan and Spanish
- Unamuno: Outline of a Philosophy (Buenos Aires: Losada, 1944)
- Four Visions of Universal History (Buenos Aires: Losada, 1945)
- Spanish Issues (Mexico: Colegio de México, 1945)
- Variations on the Spirit (Buenos Aires: South American, 1945)
- The Irony, the Death and the Admiration (Santiago de Chile: Cruz del Sur, 1946)
- The Meaning of Death (Buenos Aires: South American, 1947)
- The Book of Meaning (Santiago de Chile: Pi de les Tres Branques, 1948), in Catalan
- Hellenism and Christianity (Santiago de Chile: University of Chile, 1949)
- The Man at the Crossroads (Buenos Aires: South American, 1952)
- Disputed Questions: Essays on Philosophy (Madrid: Revista de Occidente, 1955)
- Mathematical Logic (Mexico: Fondo de Cultura Económica, 1955), co-authored with Hugues Leblanc
- Ortega y Gasset: An Outline of His Philosophy (London: Bowes and New Haven: Yale University, 1957), in English
- What Is Logic (Buenos Aires: Columba, 1957)
- Philosophy in Today's World (Madrid: Revista de Occidente, 1959)
- Being and Death: Outline of Integrationist Philosophy (Madrid: Aguilar, 1962)
- Three Worlds: Catalonia, Spain, Europe (Barcelona and Buenos Aires: EDHASA, 1963)
- Being and Meaning (Madrid: Revista de Occidente, 1967)
- Inquiries About Language (Madrid: Alianza, 1970)
- Words and Men (Barcelona: 62, 1970), in Catalan
- Man and His Environment and Other Essays (Madrid: Siglo Veintiuno, 1971)
- Shift in Philosophy (Madrid: Alianza, 1974)
- Cinema Without Philosophies (Madrid: Esti-Arte, 1974)
- From Matter to Reason (Madrid: Alianza, 1979)
- Seven Capital Stories (Barcelona: Planeta, 1979)
- Applied Ethics: From Abortion to Violence (Madrid: Alianza, 1981), co-authored with Priscilla Cohn
- Claudia, My Claudia (Madrid: Alianza, 1982)
- The World of the Writer (Barcelona: Crítica, 1983)
- Ways of Doing Philosophy (Barcelona: Crítica, 1985)
- Voltaire in New York (Madrid: Alianza, 1985)
- Foundations of Philosophy (Madrid: Alianza, 1985)
- Made in Corona (Madrid: Alianza, 1986)
- Window to the World (Barcelona: Crítica, 1986)
- Dictionary of Great Philosophers 2 (Madrid: Alianza, 1986)
- The Truth Game (Barcelona: Ediciones Destino, 1988)
- Return from Hell (Barcelona: Anthropos, 1989)
- Miss Goldie (Barcelona: Seix Barral, 1991)
- Women on the Verge of Legend (Barcelona: Círculo de readers, 1991)
- Butterflies and Superstrings: Dictionary for Our Time (Barcelona: Peninsula, 1994)

== See also ==
- List of animal rights advocates
