= Journal of Animal Ethics =

Animal ethics journal

- Discipline: Animal ethics
- Language: English
- Edited by: Andrew Linzey; Clair Linzey

Publication details
- History: 2011–present
- Publisher: University of Illinois Press in partnership with the Oxford Centre for Animal Ethics
- Frequency: Biannual

Standard abbreviations
- ISO 4: J. Anim. Ethics

Indexing
- ISSN: 2156-5414 (print); 2160-1267 (web)
- LCCN: 2010202097
- JSTOR: 21565414
- OCLC no.: 703841372

Links
- Journal homepage; Online archive at Project MUSE; Journal page at Centre's website

The Journal of Animal Ethics (JAE) is a biannual peer-reviewed academic journal covering theoretical and applied animal ethics. Established in 2011, it is published by the University of Illinois Press in partnership with the Oxford Centre for Animal Ethics. The journal publishes research from the humanities and sciences concerning the ethical treatment of animals, including work in philosophy, law, history, religion and other disciplines. Its contents include scholarly articles, shorter argumentative pieces, review articles and book reviews.

The journal was founded with Andrew Linzey and Priscilla Cohn as co-editors. Cohn retired from the position in 2016 and was succeeded by Clair Linzey, beginning with volume 6, issue 2. Andrew and Clair Linzey are the current co-editors. The journal is abstracted and indexed in Scopus.

== See also ==
- Between the Species
- Etica & Animali
- Relations. Beyond Anthropocentrism
