= Relations. Beyond Anthropocentrism =

Academic journal of animal and environmental ethics

- Discipline: Animal ethics, environmental ethics
- Language: English
- Edited by: Francesco Allegri

Publication details
- History: 2013–present
- Publisher: LED Edizioni Universitarie (Italy)
- Frequency: Semiannual
- Open access: Yes

Standard abbreviations
- ISO 4: Relat. Beyond Anthr.

Indexing
- ISSN: 2283-3196 (print); 2280-9643 (web)
- OCLC no.: 980859935

Links
- Journal homepage

Relations. Beyond Anthropocentrism is an English-language, open-access, peer-reviewed academic journal published by LED Edizioni Universitarie in Italy. Established in 2013, it covers animal ethics, environmental ethics and interdisciplinary research examining relationships between humans, other living beings and the environment from non-anthropocentric perspectives. Its editor-in-chief is Francesco Allegri, with Matteo Andreozzi as associate editor.

The journal publishes research articles, commentary, debates, interviews, reviews and reports on academic events and projects. It accepts contributions from the humanities, life sciences and social sciences, and encourages submissions accessible to both academic and non-specialist readers. Research articles undergo double-blind peer review by at least two referees, while commentary, debates, interviews and reviews are not externally peer-reviewed.

Relations. Beyond Anthropocentrism published two issues annually from 2013 to 2018, followed by combined annual issues from 2019 to 2021. It resumed its semiannual schedule in 2022. The journal has published thematic issues on subjects including animal emotions, wild animal suffering, posthumanism, energy ethics, non-human agency, decolonial animal ethics and Indigenous philosophies. Its 2025 issues addressed sentientism, human supremacy and biodiversity loss.

The journal is indexed in Scopus, the Directory of Open Access Journals and ERIH PLUS. Its articles are published under a Creative Commons Attribution-NonCommercial-NoDerivatives licence.

== See also ==
- Between the Species
- Etica & Animali
- Journal of Animal Ethics
