= Martin Henig =

British archaeologist and Anglican priest

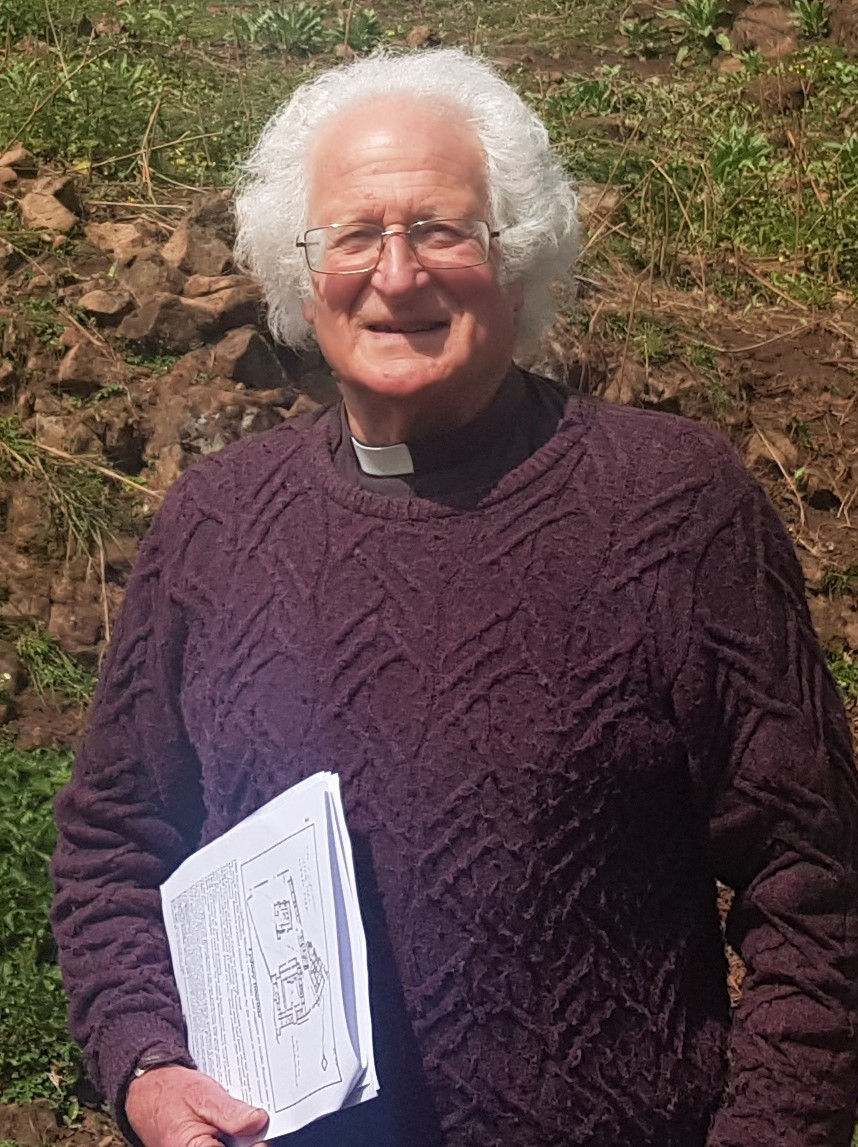
The Reverend Henig in 2019

Martin Henig (born 22 March 1942) is a British archaeologist, ethicist, and Anglican clergyman. He is a senior member of Wolfson College, Oxford.

== Early life and education ==
He was born on 22 March 1942 at Harrow, Middlesex. He was educated at Merchant Taylors' School, Northwood, St Catharine's College, Cambridge, the UCL Institute of Archaeology, and Worcester College, Oxford.

== Archaeological career ==
His main field of interest is Roman art, especially engraved gems; he has also published widely on Roman religion, Roman Britain, and Roman sculpture. From 1985 to 2007 he was editor of the Journal of the British Archaeological Association.

== Academic recognition ==
His contributions were honoured in 1998 by Oxford University, which awarded him the higher degree of Doctor of Letters. In 2007 he was presented with a Festschrift. On 3 March 1975, he was elected a Fellow of the Society of Antiquaries of London (FSA).

== Church and ethics activities ==
Having trained at St Stephen's House, Oxford, Henig was ordained in the Church of England as a deacon in 2010 and as a priest in 2011. From 2010 to 2018, he was a non-stipendiary minister at St Frideswide's Church, Osney in the Diocese of Oxford. He has held permission to officiate in the Diocese of Oxford since 2018.

He is a member of the Lesbian and Gay Christian Movement. He was a founder member of Voice for Ethical Research in Oxford, a Fellow of the Oxford Centre for Animal Ethics, and is vice-president of the Anglican Society for the Welfare of Animals. He is a director of the Animal Interfaith Alliance.
