= Humphry Primatt =

English clergyman and writer (1735–1777)

The Reverend Humphry Primatt
- Title page of Primatt's A Dissertation on the Duty of Mercy and Sin of Cruelty to Brute Animals (1776)
- Baptised: 24 April 1735; St Andrew Holborn, London, England
- Died: 23 February 1777; Kingston upon Thames, England
- Resting place: St Mary's Church, Higham
- Other name: Humphrey Primatt
- Education: Clare College, Cambridge (B.A., 1757; M.A., 1764)
- Occupations: Clergyman; writer
- Known for: Writing on animal ethics
- Notable work: A Dissertation on the Duty of Mercy and Sin of Cruelty to Brute Animals (1776)
- Spouse: Sarah Gullifer (m. 1769)

Humphry Primatt (baptised 24 April 1735 – 23 February 1777) was an English clergyman and writer on animal ethics. His only known work, A Dissertation on the Duty of Mercy and Sin of Cruelty to Brute Animals (1776), argued that animals possessed rights grounded in Christian theology and natural law, including a "right to happiness", and that humans had no right to inflict unnecessary suffering on them. The work has been regarded as an early contribution to the development of animal rights thought.

== Life ==
Primatt was born in London and baptised on 24 April 1735 at St Andrew Holborn. He was the second son of the Reverend William Primatt, rector of West Walton, Norfolk, and his wife, Elizabeth.

He entered Clare College, Cambridge, as a pensioner on 11 July 1752, matriculated later that year, graduated B.A. in 1757 and proceeded M.A. in 1764. He was ordained deacon in 1758 and priest in 1759. In 1759 he served as curate of Bardwell and Honington, and in 1760 he was licensed as perpetual curate of Higham. He became vicar of Swardeston in 1766 and rector of Brampton in 1771.

On 2 November 1769, he married Sarah Gullifer, daughter of John Wood, at St Katharine Cree in London. When his father died in 1770, Primatt inherited half of his estate, with the other half passing to his elder brother William.

Primatt was a signatory to the Feathers Tavern petition of 1771–1772, which sought relief from the requirement that Church of England clergy and university graduates subscribe to the Thirty-nine Articles. Marischal College in Aberdeen awarded him a Doctor of Divinity on 3 September 1773.

Bridgen's study of Primatt's correspondence places his later religious thought in the context of Rational Dissent. Letters to the Scottish minister John Calder in 1773 and 1774 record Primatt's dissatisfaction with doctrinal restrictions within the established church and his interest in Dissenting writers, including Joseph Priestley and Theophilus Lindsey. Primatt became involved with Lindsey's congregation at Essex Street Chapel. Although he initially expressed reservations about Lindsey's plan to establish a new chapel, he was one of its original benefactors, contributing £50, and attended its opening on 17 April 1774.

Primatt resigned his remaining living at Higham at the end of 1774 and subsequently lived at Kingston upon Thames. Earlier accounts gave his death as late 1776 or early 1777, but Bridgen identified a contemporary notice in the London Chronicle recording that he died at Kingston upon Thames on 23 February 1777. He was buried at St Mary's Church, Higham, Suffolk, on 2 March.

His will, proved on 29 March, left most of his estate to his wife. He bequeathed his books in Latin, Greek and Hebrew to Marischal College. No children were mentioned in the will. His widow remarried on 24 July 1780.

== Animal ethics ==
Primatt published A Dissertation on the Duty of Mercy and Sin of Cruelty to Brute Animals in 1776. Richard D. Ryder describes it as one of the first books devoted entirely to an attack on cruelty to animals. Primatt intended the work for a broad readership, addressing it to people of different social ranks, including those without a formal education. Ran Segev places the book within the religious Enlightenment, arguing that Primatt combined Christian teachings with contemporary ideas about natural law, rights, liberty and property.

Primatt's argument centred on the capacity of animals to experience pain. He wrote that "pain is pain, whether it be inflicted on man or on beast", arguing that a suffering animal experiences an evil irrespective of its species. He regarded differences in reason, speech and bodily form as irrelevant to whether suffering deserved moral consideration. Segev describes this as an early welfare theory based on sentience, under which animals' inability to reason did not remove their claim to moral consideration.

Primatt repeatedly described animals as possessing rights. He held that every living creature had a "Right to Happiness" and argued that inflicting unnecessary pain violated the laws of nature. He maintained that even animals regarded as insignificant had the same claim against unnecessary suffering, writing that a fly had feeling as well as an ox and that a toad had as much right to happiness as a canary. Segev interprets Primatt's use of the language of rights as an attempt to extend concepts derived from natural law beyond humans while retaining a hierarchical view of creation.

Ryder notes that Primatt drew a parallel between what would later be termed racism and speciesism. Primatt argued that skin colour gave a white person no right to enslave a black person and, by analogy, that differences in bodily form gave humans no right to torment other animals. He extended this argument to physical characteristics such as the number of legs, the presence of hair, horns or tails, and differences in forms of communication. Segev places this comparison in the context of eighteenth-century critiques of slavery and the contemporary growth of the abolitionist movement, while observing that Primatt opposed the abuse of domesticated animals rather than animal domestication itself.

His argument was grounded in Christian theology. Primatt held that justice and mercy derived from God and could not be restricted to humans. He regarded cruelty to animals as incompatible with Christianity, writing that "cruelty is atheism" and "cruelty is the worst of heresies". He also argued that if animals had no expectation of compensation in an afterlife, their suffering during their earthly lives gave humans an additional reason not to mistreat them. Segev interprets this argument as an inversion of claims that animals' lesser cognitive capacities justified their inferior moral status: for Primatt, their inability to anticipate relief from present suffering instead increased the human obligation to avoid causing it.

Primatt distinguished between duties towards wild and domesticated animals. He wrote that the human duty towards animals "wild by nature" was to "Let them alone", arguing that people should leave them unmolested. He described their natural environment as "their province" and argued that wild animals should remain "at liberty". Victor J. Krawczyk and Monica A. Hamilton-Bruce nevertheless observe that his principal concern was with animals placed under human "care, management and protection". They describe as "ad hoc and arbitrary" his division of animals into categories such as "Brutes of ferocity", which he considered dangerous to humans, and "Brutes of humanity", which were useful to them.

For domesticated animals, Primatt described human duties under the headings of food, rest and fair use, which he regarded as rights guaranteed by natural religion. He argued that humans were only "temporary tenants" of the earth and had no absolute property in nature. In discussing cattle, he maintained that grass was not a human gift to animals but had been provided for them by God and was therefore "their right; their property". Segev interprets this argument as a use of Lockean language of natural rights and property to establish claims belonging to animals themselves.

Primatt also considered whether cruelty to animals should become a matter of law. He suggested that if practices causing suffering were made illegal as well as sinful, violence among humans might also decline. Segev argues that Primatt thereby moved beyond private moral exhortation towards the idea that governments had a responsibility to protect animals from cruelty.

Primatt did not advocate vegetarianism. He accepted that humans could kill animals for food, while denying that this permitted unnecessary suffering. Segev also stresses that Primatt remained anthropocentric and did not advocate equality between species. Primatt regarded hierarchy and subordination as part of the natural order, while maintaining that human dominion did not include a right to abuse or oppress other creatures.

== Reception and influence ==
Primatt's book received favourable reviews on publication. The Monthly Review praised his "learned and laboured deductions", while The Critical Review gave the work its "warmest approbation". Extracts and adaptations circulated after his death. An excerpt appeared in the Town and Country Magazine in 1779, and the Dorset clergyman John Toogood produced The Country Clergyman's Shrovetide Gift to His Parishioners, drawn chiefly from Primatt's work. Toogood's text reached a third edition in Britain and was included in a fourth edition published in Boston in 1802.

Arthur Broome edited a new edition of Primatt's book in 1822, with further editions appearing in 1831 and 1834. Primatt's work influenced Broome, who was involved with Richard Martin, William Wilberforce and others in establishing the Society for the Prevention of Cruelty to Animals in 1824, later the Royal Society for the Prevention of Cruelty to Animals. Ran Segev argues that Primatt's synthesis of Christian ethics and concern for animal suffering supplied part of the theological basis adopted by the early society. Broome's founding statement similarly presented cruelty to animals as incompatible with Christian morality.

Henry Stephens Salt later cited Primatt in Animals' Rights: Considered in Relation to Social Progress, describing the dissertation as a "quaint but excellent book". Ryder has compared Primatt's emphasis on suffering with Jeremy Bentham's later formulation that the relevant question concerning animals was not whether they could reason or speak, but whether they could suffer. Segev likewise identifies Primatt's emphasis on non-cognitive sentience as an antecedent to Bentham's argument, and cites Aaron Garrett's description of Primatt as "one of the most important figures in the development of a notion of animal rights".

Bridgen places Primatt between established Anglicanism and Rational Dissent rather than characterising him simply as a religious radical. He argues that Primatt's later influence came partly from presenting ideas already found among Anglican and Dissenting animal theologians in a form accessible to a wider readership. Segev similarly describes Primatt as politically conservative and opposed to egalitarianism, but regards his extension of rights to non-human animals as a departure from prevailing accounts of rights in the eighteenth century.

== Works ==
- A Dissertation on the Duty of Mercy and Sin of Cruelty to Brute Animals (1776) at the Internet Archive

== See also ==
- Christianity and animal rights
- Cruelty to animals
- History of animal rights
- James Granger
- John Hildrop
- John Oswald
- Thomas Tryon
