= Clair Linzey =

British theologian and ethicist

- Born: Clair Susan Linzey
- Father: Andrew Linzey

Education
- Education: University of St Andrews (M.A., PhD); Harvard Divinity School (MST)
- Thesis: Developing Animal Theology: An Engagement with Leonardo Boff

Philosophical work
- Era: 21st-century philosophy
- Region: Western philosophy
- Institutions: Graduate Theological Foundation; Oxford Centre for Animal Ethics; Wycliffe Hall, Oxford
- Main interests: Animal theology; Animal ethics; Environmental ethics; doctrine of creation; Systematic theology; Liberation theology; Feminist theology; Christian ethics
- Notable works: Journal of Animal Ethics; Palgrave Macmillan Animal Ethics Series

Clair Susan Linzey is a British theologian, ethicist, editor, and writer. She is the Frances Power Cobbe Professor of Animal Theology at the Graduate Theological Foundation and Deputy Director of the Oxford Centre for Animal Ethics. Linzey specialises in animal theology and ethics, environmental ethics, the doctrine of creation, systematic theology, liberation theology, feminist theology, and Christian ethics. She is co-editor of the Journal of Animal Ethics and the Palgrave Macmillan Animal Ethics Series.

== Early life and education ==
Clair Susan Linzey is the daughter of the theologian Andrew Linzey. In 2004, she received an undergraduate Master of Arts in Theological Studies from the University of St Andrews, where she received several prizes. She received two scholarships to study for a Master of Theological Studies at Harvard Divinity School, graduating in 2008. She later completed a Doctor of Philosophy at St Andrews on the ecological theology of Leonardo Boff, with particular attention to its treatment of animals.

== Career ==
Linzey is the Frances Power Cobbe Professor of Animal Theology at the Graduate Theological Foundation, Deputy Director of the Oxford Centre for Animal Ethics, director of the centre's annual summer school, and a Research Fellow in Animal Ethics at Wycliffe Hall, Oxford. With Andrew Linzey, she co-edits the Palgrave Macmillan Animal Ethics Series and the Journal of Animal Ethics. Her areas of work include animal theology and ethics, environmental ethics, the doctrine of creation, systematic theology, liberation theology, feminist theology, and Christian ethics.

== Bibliography ==
Books authored by Clair Linzey

- Developing Animal Theology: An Engagement with Leonardo Boff. Routledge. 2021.

Books co-authored with Andrew Linzey

- An Ethical Critique of Fur Factory Farming. Palgrave Macmillan. 2022. doi:10.1007/978-3-031-10621-7.

Books co-edited with Andrew Linzey

- Animal Ethics for Veterinarians. University of Illinois Press. 2017.
- The Ethical Case Against Animal Experiments. University of Illinois Press. 2018.
- The Palgrave Macmillan Handbook of Practical Animal Ethics. Palgrave Macmillan. 2018.
- The Routledge Handbook of Religion and Animal Ethics. Routledge. 2018.
- Ethical Vegetarianism and Veganism. Routledge. 2018.
- Animal Ethics and Animal Law. Lexington Books. 2023.
- Animal Theologians. Oxford University Press. 2023.
- The Ethics of Fur: Religious, Cultural, and Legal Perspectives. Rowman & Littlefield. 2023.
- Animal History: History as if Animals Mattered. Wipf and Stock. 2025.
