= Peter Wexler =

British scholar (1923–2002)

Peter Jacob Wexler (1923–2002) was a British Romance scholar and lexicographer.

== Life and work ==
He received his doctorate from the University of Paris in 1951 on La formation du vocabulaire des chemins de fer en France, 1778–1842 (The Development of Railway Jargon in France, 1778–1842). He first taught at the University of Manchester, then at the University of Essex. Wexler contributed many materials for Bernard Quemada's Matériaux pour l'histoire du vocabulaire français. He also contributed 50,000 quotations to the Oxford English Dictionary, including over 500 first datings of words. He also published in Cahiers de lexicologie.
