= Oxford Centre for Animal Ethics =

British animal ethics think tank

- The Ferrater Mora Oxford Centre for Animal Ethics
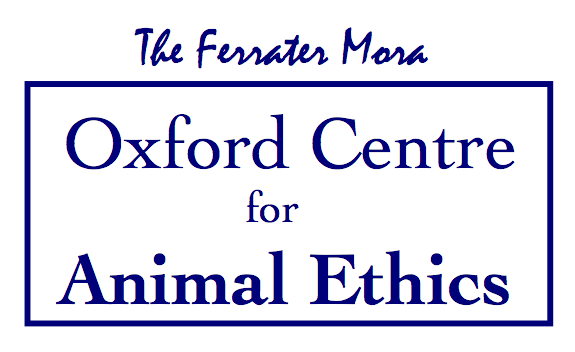
- Named after: José Ferrater Mora
- Formation: 2006; 20 years ago
- Founder: Andrew Linzey
- Location: 91 Iffley Road, Oxford, England
- Coordinates: 51.747°N 1.241°W
- Field: Animal ethics
- Director: Andrew Linzey
- Deputy Director: Clair Linzey
- Publication: The Palgrave Macmillan Animal Ethics Series; Journal of Animal Ethics
- Website: oxfordanimalethics.com

The Ferrater Mora Oxford Centre for Animal Ethics is an independent think tank based in Oxford, England. Founded in 2006 by Andrew Linzey, it promotes the study of animal ethics through academic research, teaching and publication. Its activities include conferences, research projects and academic publishing. The centre is not affiliated with the University of Oxford.

== History ==
The centre was founded in Oxford in 2006 by Andrew Linzey, then a member of the Faculty of Theology and Religion, University of Oxford. It is not affiliated with the university. The centre is named after the Catalan philosopher José Ferrater Mora, who opposed bullfighting. Its founding fellows included Ara Paul Barsam and Mark H. Bernstein.

At its launch in November 2006, the centre had recruited more than 100 academics from ten countries as advisers. Its initial research interests included the relationship between animal abuse and violence towards humans. The centre also called for public debate about animal experimentation and opposed violence and intimidation in animal rights campaigns.

In September 2007, the centre held an International Conference on the Relationship between Animal Abuse and Human Violence at Keble College, Oxford. The conference examined evidence connecting cruelty to animals with interpersonal violence and considered its implications for social and legal policy. Contributions from the conference were subsequently published in the 2009 collection The Link Between Animal Abuse and Human Violence, edited by Linzey.

== Work ==
The centre says its purpose is to encourage academic study and public discussion of ethical concern for animals, and to form an international association of academics working on animal ethics.

=== Publications ===
The centre established an academic book series in partnership with Palgrave Macmillan in 2009, titled The Palgrave Macmillan Animal Ethics Series. The series publishes work on the ethical treatment of animals from disciplines including philosophy, history, law, political theory and religion. Its first two titles were An Introduction to Animals and Political Theory by Alasdair Cochrane and An Introduction to Animals and the Law by Joan E. Schaffner, both published in 2010.

In 2011, the centre and the University of Illinois Press launched the Journal of Animal Ethics, a biannual academic journal covering theoretical and applied questions about the moral status and treatment of animals. Both the book series and the journal were initially edited by Andrew Linzey and philosopher Priscilla Cohn, and are now edited by Andrew and Clair Linzey.

=== Research ===
In 2015, a working group of the centre published Normalising the Unthinkable: The Ethics of Using Animals in Research, a report commissioned by the British Union for the Abolition of Vivisection. The group comprised 20 academics from six countries and examined ethical arguments concerning animal experimentation. It concluded that the practice could not be morally justified and called for an end to its institutional acceptance. The report formed the first part of the 2018 collection The Ethical Case against Animal Experiments, edited by Andrew and Clair Linzey and published by the University of Illinois Press.

=== Summer schools and conferences ===
Since 2014, the centre has organised the Oxford Animal Ethics Summer School, an international academic conference addressing different aspects of animal ethics. Subjects have included religion and animal protection (2014), the ethics of animal experimentation (2015), animal law (2018), humane education (2019), animals and the media (2023), and the history of animal protection (2024).

The 2025 summer school, held at Merton College, Oxford, examined the ethics of keeping animals in captivity, including their use in agriculture, scientific research, zoos and aquaculture. In the same year, the centre established an Animal Ethics and Law Partnership with the Animal Law Program at George Washington University Law School, whose faculty and students contributed presentations to the summer school.

The 2026 summer school addressed ethical strategies for animal protection, including legal, political, philosophical and cultural approaches to changing human treatment of animals.

== Members ==
The centre has an international fellowship drawn from academic disciplines in the humanities and sciences. Fellows include Robert Garner and Martin Henig. In 2017, it appointed eight additional fellows, including animal rights lawyer Steven M. Wise, bringing its fellowship to more than 100 members.

Honorary fellows include J. M. Coetzee, Joy Carter, Bob Barker, Philip Wollen and Michelle Thew. In June 2026, the centre appointed South African humane education advocate Louise van der Merwe as its thirteenth honorary fellow.

== See also ==
- Animal Ethics (organization)
- UPF-Centre for Animal Ethics
