= Priscilla Cohn =

American philosopher (1933–2019)

- Priscilla Cohn in 2012
- Born: Priscilla T. Neuman; December 14, 1933; Radnor Township, Pennsylvania, U.S.
- Died: June 27, 2019 (aged 85); Villanova, Pennsylvania, U.S.
- Spouses: Willard Cohn (m. 1951; div. 1980) José Ferrater Mora (m. 1980; died 1991)

Education
- Education: Bryn Mawr College (BA, MA, PhD)
- Thesis: The Idea of Nothing in the Philosophy of Martin Heidegger (1969)
- Doctoral advisor: José Ferrater Mora

Philosophical work
- Era: Contemporary philosophy
- Region: Western philosophy
- School: Continental philosophy
- Institutions: Pennsylvania State University
- Main interests: Animal ethics, environmental ethics, history of philosophy
- Notable ideas: Advocacy of wildlife contraception as an alternative to culling

Priscilla T. Neuman Cohn Ferrater Mora (née Neuman; December 14, 1933 – June 27, 2019) was an American philosopher and animal rights activist. She was Emerita Professor of Philosophy at Pennsylvania State University, associate director of the Oxford Centre for Animal Ethics, and co-editor of the centre's Journal of Animal Ethics and the Palgrave Macmillan Animal Ethics Series.

== Biography ==
Cohn was born to Simon and Helen Neuman, one of five children, in Radnor Township, Pennsylvania, in 1933. She studied at Haverford Friends School, leaving early to study at Baldwin School in Bryn Mawr. In 1951, she eloped with Willard Cohn. Cohn then enrolled in Bryn Mawr College, earning a bachelor's, a master's, and a PhD in philosophy, between 1956 and 1969. She wrote her thesis on the work of Heidegger; her doctoral advisor was the Spanish philosopher José Ferrater Mora. She separated with Willard Cohn in 1969 (they divorced in 1980); Cohn married Ferrater Mora the same year.

She taught philosophy for more than 35 years at Pennsylvania State University, writing on a variety of topics including animals, environmental issues, and ethical problems, as well as on contemporary philosophers and the history of philosophy, publishing in both English and Spanish.

Cohn was made full Professor in Philosophy at Pennsylvania State University in 1982, and was made Professor Emerita at Pennsylvania State University Abington in 2001. She pioneered courses in animal ethics and lectured on five continents. From 1990 to 1993, she was Director of the Summer School Course in animal rights at Complutense University (Madrid) at El Escorial — which were the first courses of their kind in Spain. She also taught the Graduate School Course on Applied Ethics at the University of Santiago de Compostela, in 1991.

Her interest in wildlife was reflected in her work as the founder and director of P.N.C. Corp, a nonprofit animal rights foundation that organised the first international conference on contraception in wildlife in the United States and initiated and funded the first PZP fertility control study on white-tailed deer. She was also a board member of The Fund for Animals and Humane USA.

Cohn died at her home in Villanova, Pennsylvania, on 27 June 2019, due to complications relating to Parkinson's disease.

== Selected publications ==
- Etica aplicada (Applied Ethics; Alianza Editorial, 1981), written with José Ferrater Mora, containing the first essay on animal rights published in Spain
- Contraception in Wildlife (Edwin Mellen Press, 1996), edited with E. D. Plotka and U. S. Seal
- Ethics and Wildlife (Edwin Mellen Press, 1999)
- La Filosofia de Ferrater Mora (The Philosophy of Ferrater Mora; Documenta Universitaria, 2007)

== See also ==
- List of animal rights advocates
