= Paola Cavalieri =

Italian philosopher (born 1950)

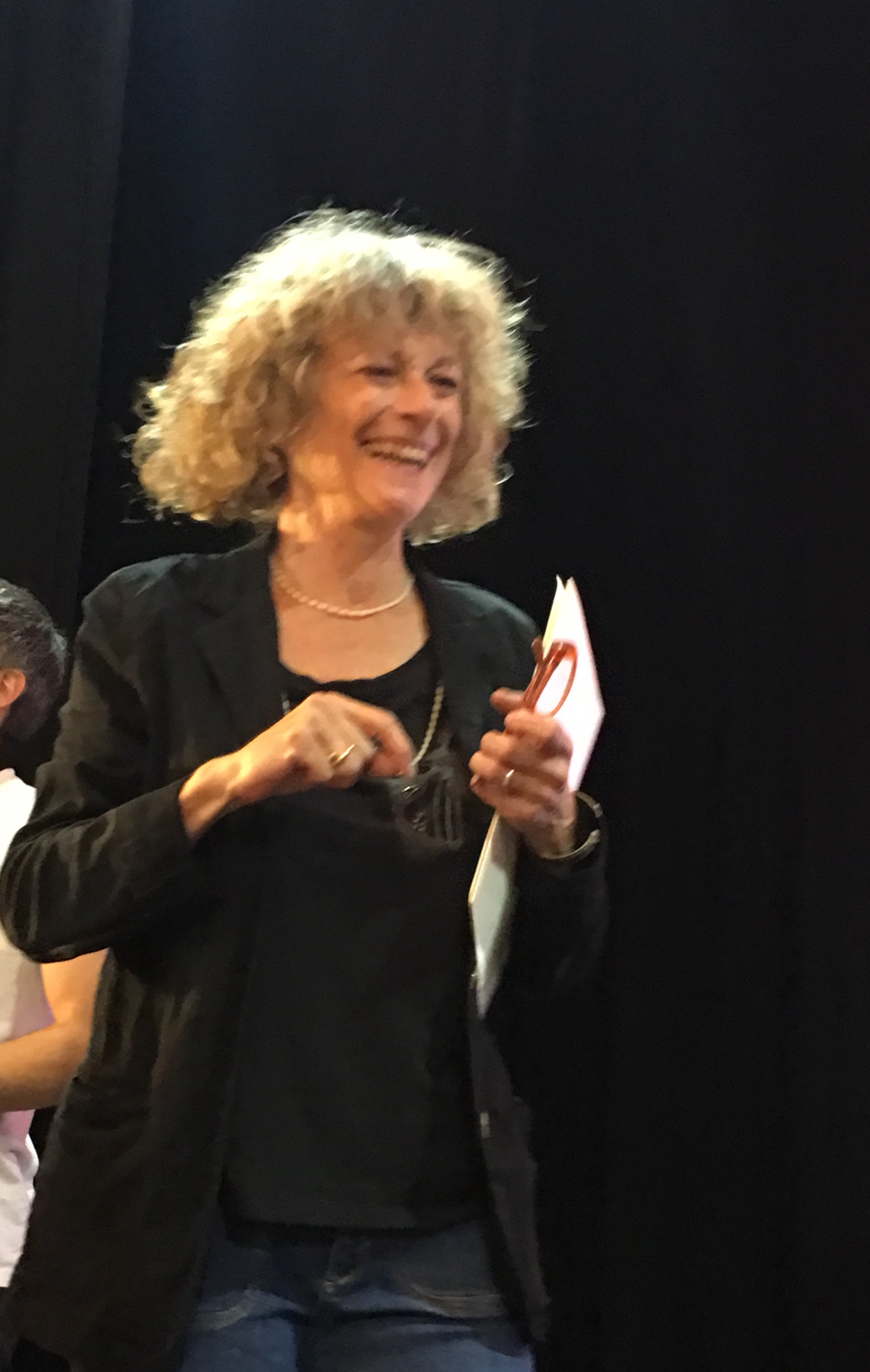
- Born: 26 October 1950 (age 76)
- Occupation: Philosopher
- Known for: Great Ape Project

Paola Cavalieri (born 26 October 1950) is an Italian philosopher, most known for her work arguing for extension of human rights to the other great apes and more broadly, "to mammals and birds, and probably vertebrates in general". In addition to her books, she was the editor of Etica & Animali, a quarterly international philosophy journal that published nine volumes from 1988 to 1998.

== See also ==
- List of animal rights advocates

== Books ==
- The Great Ape Project: Equality Beyond Humanity (Co-edited with Peter Singer. New York: St. Martin's Press, 1994. ISBN 978-0-312-10473-3. Paperback edition published by St. Martin's Griffin, 1994. ISBN 978-0-312-11818-1.) Widely cited in the academic literature.
- The Animal Question: Why Nonhuman Animals Deserve Human Rights (Originally published in Italian as La Questione Animale in 1999. Translated by Catherine Woollard. Revised by Paola Cavalieri. New York: Oxford University Press, 2001. ISBN 978-0-19-514380-5. New edition published in 2003. ISBN 978-0-19-517365-9.)

== Press and scholarly coverage ==
- Reviews of The Great Ape Project: Jonathan Marks, Human Biology, December 1994. "A Trans-Specific Agenda", Russell H. Tuttle (1994), Science 264(5158): 602–603. doi:10.1126/science.264.5158.602-a "Keeping it in the family," Robert Wokler, Times Literary Supplement, 17 September 1993, reprinted in James Koobatian, The Thinking Reader, Wadsworth 2002.
- "Isn't It Time to Give Chimps Their Due?" Letter by Calavieri to New York Times, printed 10 February 1997; "Don't Slight Disabled for Animal Rights' Sake," rejoinder by two Yale faculty members, printed 16 February 1997. The same two faculty members repeated their criticism in Groce, Nora Ellen; Marks, Jonathan (2000), "The Great Ape Project and disability rights : Ominous undercurrents of eugenics in action", American Anthropologist, 102 (4): 818–822, doi:10.1525/aa.2000.102.4.818.
- "Rattling the cage". Salon. 4 February 2000. Archived from the original on 17 October 2007. This review of a book by Steven Wise on animal rights briefly mentions The Great Ape Project as a precursor.
- "Animal Liberation at 30", Peter Singer, New York Review of Books, May 15, 2003. An extensive review of four books, one of which is Cavalieri's The Animal Question: Why Non-human Animals Deserve Human Rights.
- "Maintenir l'homme à part sans soumettre son statut au diktat des savoirs," Le Monde, 27 June 2003. Includes a mention of Cavalieri's work. In French.
- Review of The Animal Question by Marco Calarco (2004), International Studies in Philosophy 36(4): 109–110, calling Cavalieri "one of the premier international animal rights theorists writing today".
- "Great apes deserve life, liberty and the prohibition of torture", Peter Singer, The Guardian, 27 May 2006. This story by the other Great Ape Project founder describes the project in some detail as background to its pro-animal-rights message. Reprinted in the Taipei Times , China Daily, and Daily Times .
- "Spain to regard apes as ‘legal persons’." Article from The Guardian, 9 June 2006, regarding a Spanish resolution "based on the work of the Great Ape Project, which was founded in 1993 by philosophers Peter Singer and Paola Cavalieri", with several paragraphs on their work. Reprinted in the Taipei Times.
- The Encyclopædia Britannica article on apes cites The Great Ape Project as additional reading.
