= Mark H. Bernstein =

American philosopher (born 1948)

- Born: 1948 (age 77–78)

Education
- Thesis: Freedom of Will and Autonomy of Mind (1982)
- Doctoral advisor: William C. Smith

Philosophical work
- Era: 21st-century philosophy
- Region: Western philosophy
- School: Analytic
- Institutions: Purdue University
- Main interests: Metaphysics, animal ethics

Mark H. Bernstein (born 1948) is an American philosopher and Joyce & Edward E. Brewer Chair in Applied Ethics at Purdue University. He is known for his research on animal ethics.

== Biography ==
Bernstein received a B.A. in January 1969 in Mathematics from Queens College, City University of New York, a M.A. in June 1975 in Philosophy from California State University, Northridge and a Ph D. in June 1982 in Philosophy from the University of California, Santa Barbara.

Bernstein takes an abolitionist approach to animal rights. In 2015, he authored The Moral Equality of Humans and Animals.

== Selected publications ==
- Fatalism, University of Nebraska Press, 1992
- On Moral Considerability: An Essay On Who Morally Matters, Oxford University Press, 1998
- Without A Tear: Our Tragic Relationship with Animals, University of Illinois Press, 2004
- The Moral Equality of Humans and Animals, Palgrave Macmillan, 2015
- Comparing the Wrongness of Killing Humans and Killing Animals, In The Palgrave Handbook of Practical Animal Ethics, Palgrave Macmillan, 2018
