= John Hildrop =

English Anglican cleric and writer (1682–1756)

The Reverend John Hildrop
- Title page of Free Thoughts upon the Brute-Creation (1742–1743)
- Born: 30 December 1682; Petersfield, Hampshire, England
- Died: 18 January 1756 (aged 73)
- Resting place: St Mary's Church, Wath
- Other names: Phileleutherus Britannicus; Timothy Hooker
- Education: St John's College, Oxford
- Occupations: Anglican cleric; religious writer; essayist; satirist
- Known for: Free Thoughts upon the Brute-Creation (1742–1743)

John Hildrop (30 December 1682 – 18 January 1756) was an English Anglican cleric, religious writer, essayist and satirist. Educated at St John's College, Oxford, he served as master of the Marlborough Royal Free Grammar School and later as rector of Maulden, Bedfordshire, and Wath, Yorkshire. He was also chaplain to Charles, Lord Bruce, and from 1740 was a regular contributor to the Weekly Miscellany.

Hildrop wrote chiefly on religious and political subjects, often anonymously or under the pseudonyms "Phileleutherus Britannicus" and "Timothy Hooker". Much of his work was satirical or polemical and directed against deism and free-thinking. His 1742–1743 book Free Thoughts upon the Brute-Creation, written in response to the French Jesuit Guillaume-Hyacinthe Bougeant, defended animal reason and the existence of animal souls. David Perkins described it as "one of the earliest pleas for animal rights".

== Life ==
Hildrop was born in Petersfield, Hampshire, on 30 December 1682, the son of William Hildrop. He was educated at St John's College, Oxford, where he graduated B.A. on 7 July 1702, M.A. on 8 June 1705, and B.D. and D.D. on 9 June 1743.

On 14 April 1703, Hildrop was presented to the mastership of the Marlborough Royal Free Grammar School by Thomas Bruce, 2nd Earl of Ailesbury. He was also rector of Maulden, Bedfordshire. He resigned the mastership on 4 December 1733 and the rectory on 23 March 1734. On 13 April 1734, he was instituted to the rectory of Wath on the presentation of Charles, Lord Bruce, whose chaplain he was.

In 1740, Hildrop became a regular contributor to the Weekly Miscellany. He was a friend and correspondent of Zachary Grey.

Hildrop was married to Sarah, who died before him and was buried at Wath on 13 November 1741. Their daughter Catherine married Francis Bacon. She died on 6 September 1754, aged 33. Hildrop died on 18 January 1756, aged 73, and was buried in the chancel of St Mary's Church, Wath.

== Animal rights ==
In 1742–1743, Hildrop published Free Thoughts upon the Brute-Creation: or, An Examination of Father Bougeant's Philosophical Amusement, &c. In Two Letters to a Lady. The book was a response to the French Jesuit Guillaume-Hyacinthe Bougeant, whose account of animals denied them reason, understanding, moral status and immortal souls.

Hildrop argued that non-human animals possessed souls, which he considered to be in a degraded state as a consequence of the Fall of man. Andrew Linzey classed the book, after the writings of Thomas Tryon, as the earliest premodern "zoophile treatise", while Perkins described it as "one of the earliest pleas for animal rights".

== Works ==
Title page of A Proposal for Revising the Ten Commandments (1738)

Hildrop published anonymously and under the pseudonyms "Phileleutherus Britannicus" and "Timothy Hooker". His satirical and polemical essays were chiefly directed against the deists. Several were collected in the two-volume The Miscellaneous Works of John Hildrop, D.D. (1754), including:

- An Essay for the Better Regulation and Improvement of Free-Thinking.
- An Essay on Honour.
- Free Thoughts upon the Brute-Creation: or, An Examination of Father Bougeant's Philosophical Amusement.
- A Modest Apology for the Ancient and Honourable Family of the Wrongheads.
- A Letter to a Member of Parliament containing a Proposal for bringing in a Bill to revise, amend, or repeal certain obsolete Statutes commonly called the Ten Commandments. On its first appearance, the work was attributed to Jonathan Swift; it was reprinted in London in 1834.
- The Contempt of the Clergy Considered, which argued for the removal of the Church from state control.
- Some Memoirs of the Life of Simon Shallow.

His other works included:

- Reflections upon Reason (London, 1722), a satire on free-thinking published under the name Phileleutherus Britannicus. It was initially attributed to Francis Gastrell and was discussed by Thomas Morgan in Enthusiasm in Distress (1722).
- A Caveat against Popery; being a Seasonable Preservative against Romish Delusions and Jacobitism now industriously spread throughout the Nation (London, 1735).
- A Commentary upon the Second Psalm (London, 1742).
- The Husbandman's Spiritual Companion (London, 1752), a collection of sermons.
