= Blakeley =

Blakeley may refer to:

== People ==
- Blakeley (surname)

== Places in the United States ==
=== Areas and settlements ===
- Blakeley, Alabama, a ghost town
- Blakeley Township, Scott County, Minnesota
- Blakeley, New York, an unincorporated hamlet
- Blakeley, Oregon, an unincorporated historic locale
- Blakeley, Pennsylvania, a town in Lackawanna County, Pennsylvania
- Blakeley, West Virginia, an unincorporated community

=== Buildings ===
- Blakeley Building, Lawrence, Massachusetts, on the National Register of Historic Places
- Blakeley (West Virginia), an historic house near Charles Town, West Virginia

=== Landforms ===
- Blakeley River, Alabama
- Blakeley Island (Alabama)
- Blakeley Island, Washington

== Other uses ==
- USS Blakeley (DD-150), a destroyer during World War II
- Blakely v. Washington, a 2004 United States Supreme Court decision

== See also ==
- Blakeley Raise, a fell in the English Lake District
- Blakely (disambiguation)
- Blakeney (disambiguation)
