= Blakeley (surname) =

Blakeley is an English surname. Notable people with the surname include:

- Arthur Blakeley (1849–1934), Australian politician
- Bill Blakeley (1934–2010), American basketball coach
- Eric Blakeley (born 1965), English mountaineer, adventurer, and television journalist
- Grace Blakeley (born 1993), British economist and journalist
- John E. Blakeley (1888–1958), British film producer, director and screenwriter
- Johnston Blakeley (1781–1814), American naval officer
- Josiah Blakeley (died 1815), founder of Blakeley, Alabama
- Lee Blakeley (1971–2017), British opera and theatre director
- Lucas Blakeley (born 2001), British racing driver
- Paul Blakeley (born 1964), English cricketer
- Peter Blakeley, Australian singer and songwriter
- Philip Blakeley (1915–1994), New Zealand engineer and administrator
- Phyllis Blakeley (1922–1986), Canadian historian, biographer and archivist
- Robert Blakeley (1922–2017), American graphic designer
- Steve Blakeley (born 1972), English rugby league footballer
- Steven Blakeley (born 1982), British actor
- William Blakeley (1830–1897), English actor

== See also ==
- Blakely (surname)
- Blakley
