= Flat Fell =

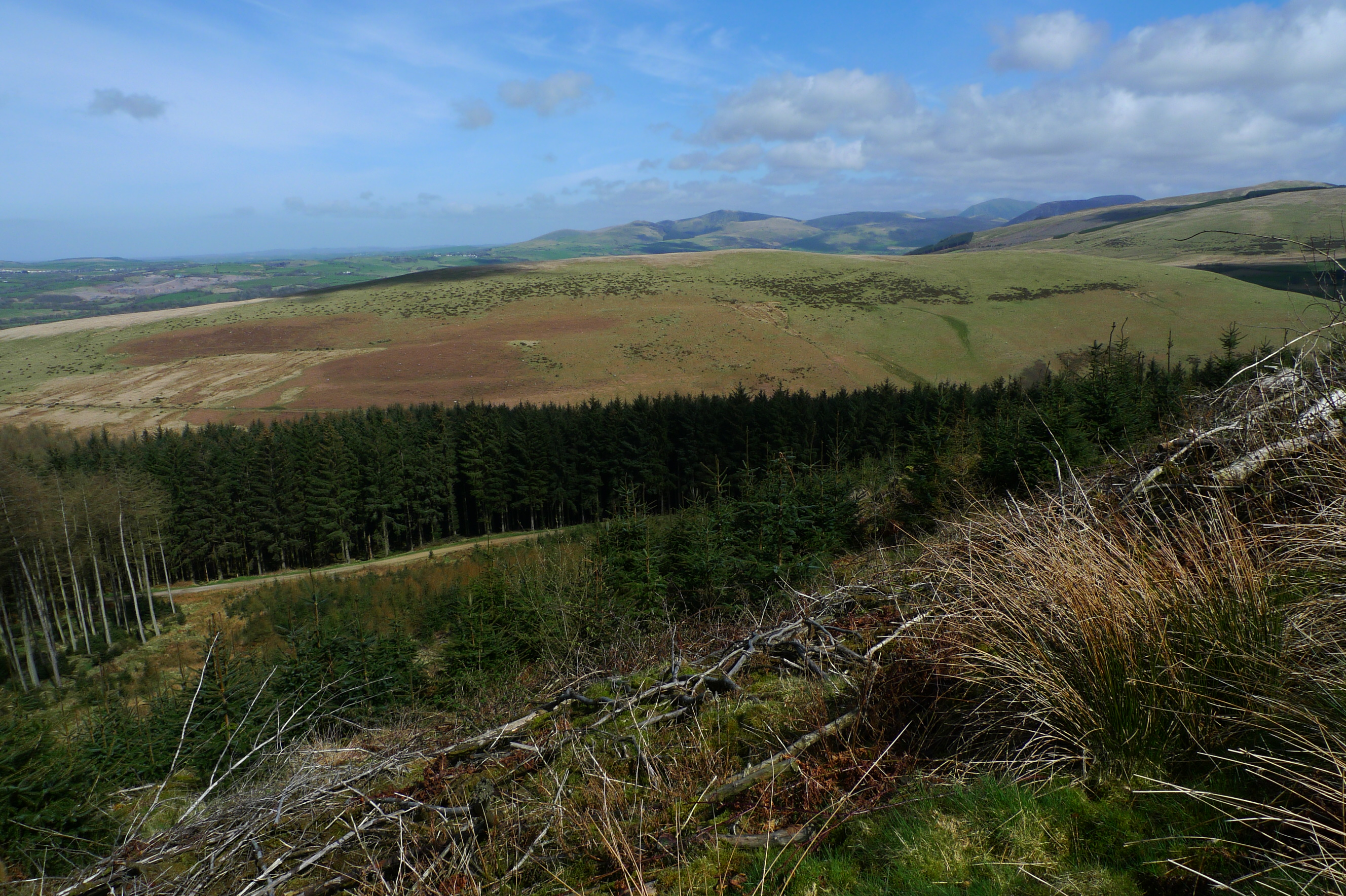
- Flat Fell from Dent

Highest point
- Elevation: 272 m (892 ft)
- Parent peak: Dent
- Listing: Outlying Wainwright
- Coordinates: 54°30′38″N 3°27′56″W

Geography
- Location within the Lake District
- Location: Lake District, England
- OS grid: NY052137

Flat Fell is a hill located on the edge of the English Lake District, standing at 272m. It is included in Alfred Wainwright's Outlying Fells of Lakeland book, sharing a chapter with Dent. Wainwright's clockwise route to the two summits starts at Wath Brow.

== Topography ==
Flat Fell has an elongated, slug-shaped profile, with a steep slope known as Flatfell Screes at the Eastern end. Flatfell Screes forms the one side of the valley of the Nannycatch Beck, along which runs part of the Coast to Coast Walk. Unlike Dent, Flat Fell is not forested and is mostly covered by open grassland, grazed by sheep and horses. The Southern and Eastern slopes are carpeted with large areas of bracken and Gorse (Ulex europaeus).

== Ascent ==
Flat fell is flanked by two rights of way; a bridleway along the Southern slope and a footpath along the Northern aspect. The latter links to the Fell Road at the Kinniside Stone Circle. Both tracks link together at the end of Nannycatch road, to the West. There are no distinct paths leading from either track to the summit.

== Summit and Views ==
The Summit of Flat Fell is marked by a cairn (not present at the time of Wainwright's visit) and provides extensive views over West Cumbria and the fells of Dent, Grike, Blakeley Raise and Lank Rigg

== Gallery ==
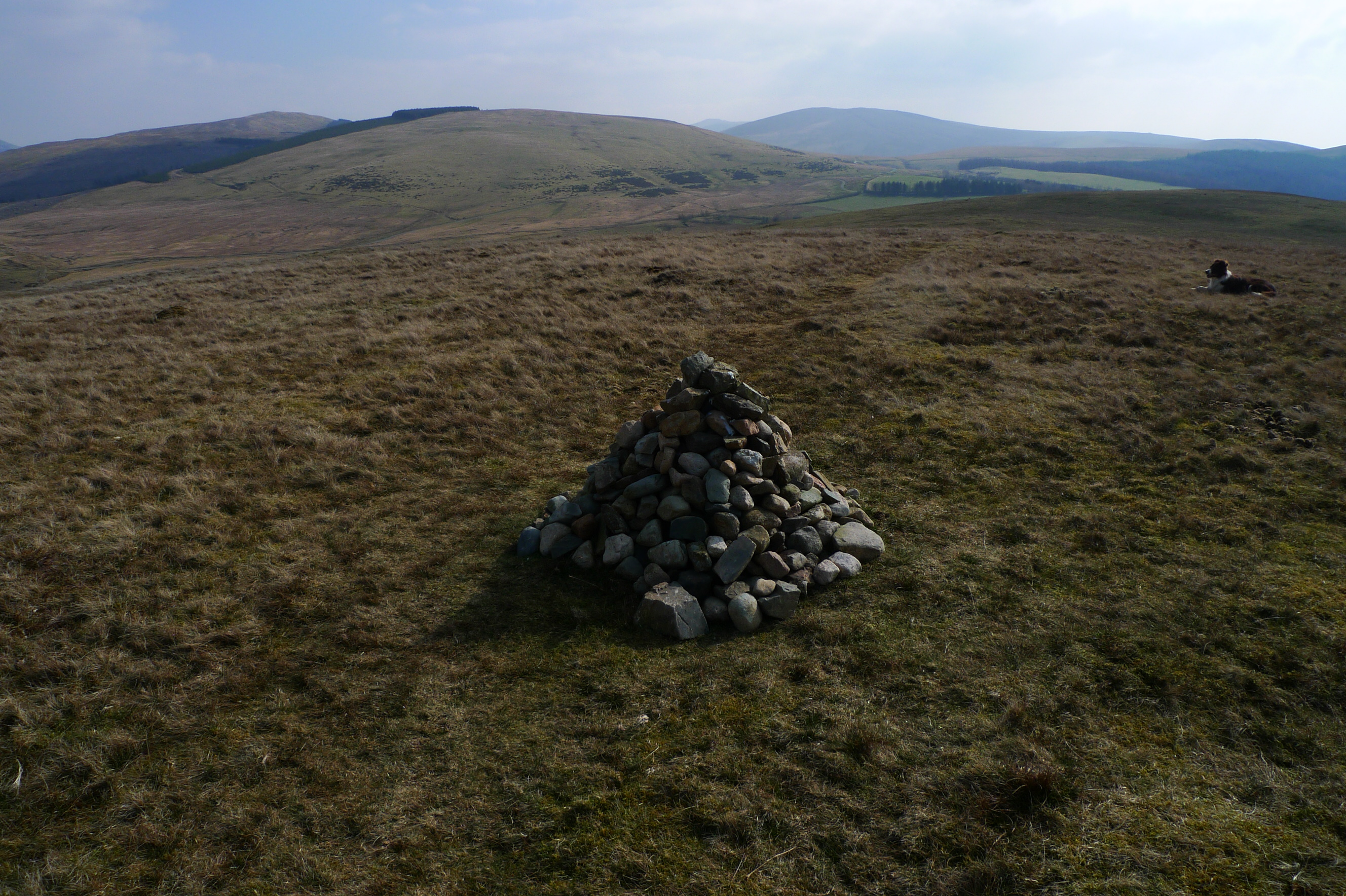
The Summit of Flat Fell, looking East towards Grike, Blakeley Raise and Lank Rigg

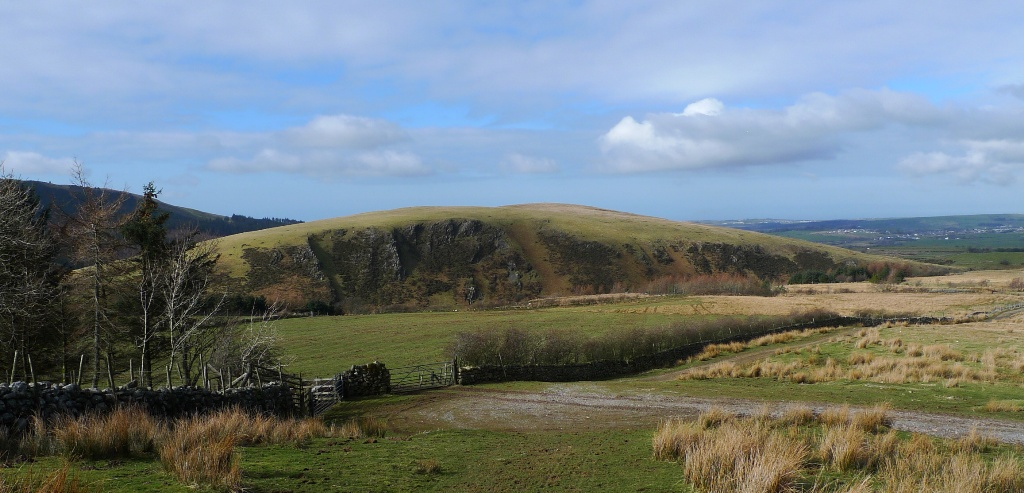
East face of Flat Fell
