= Gypsy Camp Meadows, Thrandeston =

Protected area in Suffolk, England

Coordinates: 52.353°N 1.101°E

- Site of Special Scientific Interest
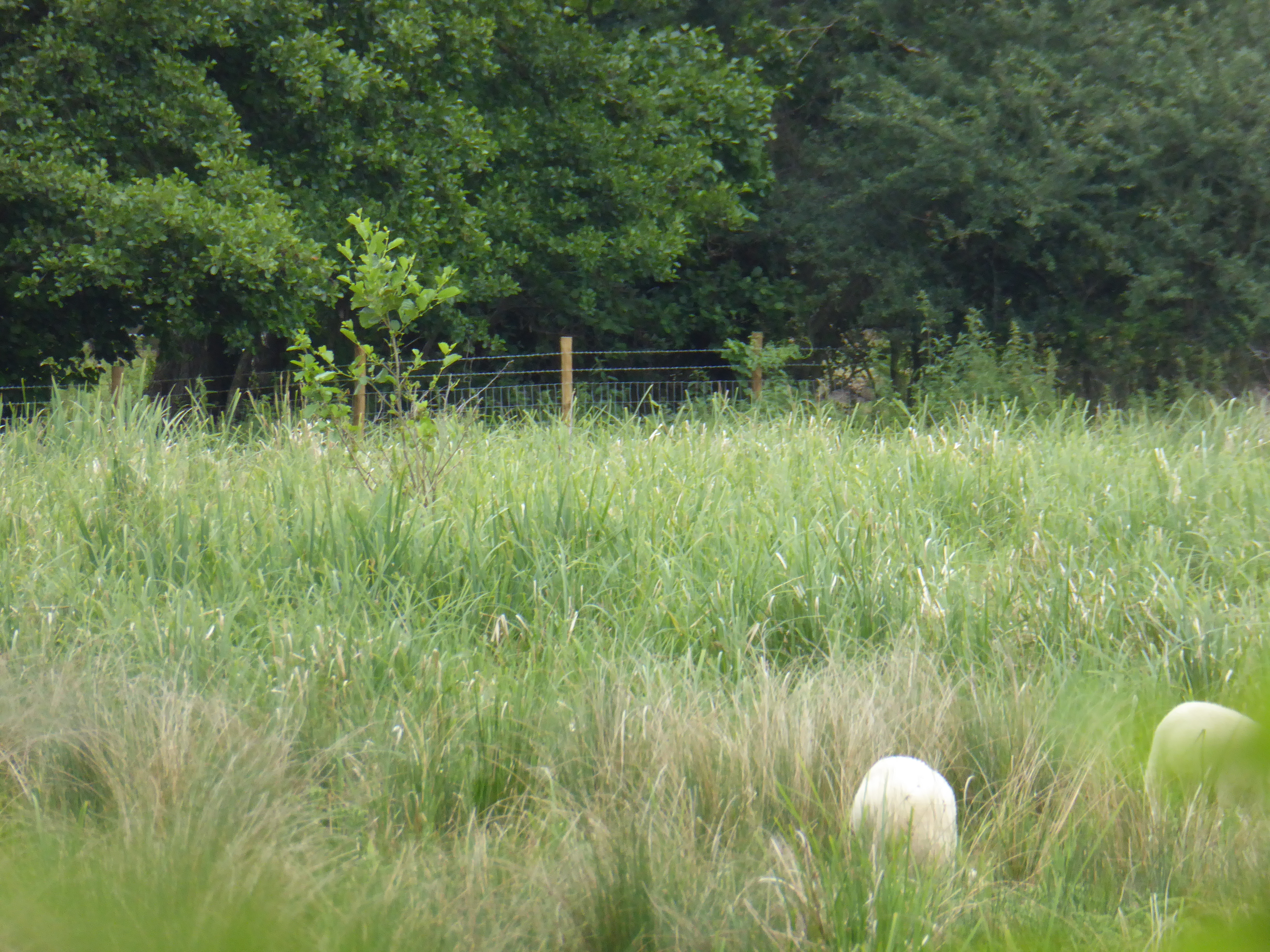
- Location of Gypsy Camp Meadows, Thrandeston.
- Area of search: Suffolk
- Grid reference: TM 113 773
- Interest: Biological
- Area: 2.4 hectares
- Notification date: 1987
- Location map: Magic Map

Gypsy Camp Meadows, Thrandeston is a 2.4-hectare (5.9-acre) biological Site of Special Scientific Interest north of Thrandeston in Suffolk.

These wet meadows on poorly drained boulder clay have a rich variety of flora, and drainage ditches, areas of drier grassland and hedges add to the diversity. Plants include early purple orchid, ragged robin, zig-zag clover and water avens.

The site is private land with no public access.
