= Free Thoughts upon the Brute-Creation =

1742–1743 book by John Hildrop

- First edition title page
- Author: John Hildrop
- Illustrator: Michael van der Gucht
- Language: English
- Subject: Animal theology; animal ethics; animal cognition; animal communication; animal souls
- Publisher: R. Minors
- Publication date: 1742–1743
- Publication place: Kingdom of Great Britain
- Media type: Print (hardcover)
- Pages: [4], 64; [4], 88
- Text: Free Thoughts upon the Brute-Creation at the Internet Archive

Free Thoughts upon the Brute-Creation: or, An Examination of Father Bougeant's Philosophical Amusement, &c. In Two Letters to a Lady is a 1742–1743 book by the English Anglican cleric John Hildrop. An early work of animal theology and animal ethics, it was written in response to the French Jesuit Guillaume-Hyacinthe Bougeant's Amusement philosophique sur le langage des bêtes (1739). Hildrop discusses animal cognition, animal communication, the nature and immortality of animal souls, the Fall of man, and the moral status and treatment of animals.

The book has been discussed as an early work in the history of animal rights. The theologian Andrew Linzey classed it, following the writings of Thomas Tryon, as the earliest premodern "zoophile treatise", while literary scholar David Perkins described it as "one of the earliest pleas for animal rights".

== Background ==
Hildrop wrote Free Thoughts in response to Guillaume-Hyacinthe Bougeant's Amusement philosophique sur le langage des bêtes, which had appeared in French in 1739 and was soon translated into English. Bougeant rejected purely mechanical explanations of animal behaviour and argued that animals communicated through species-specific languages. He attributed their mental operations, however, to evil spirits inhabiting animal bodies.

Hildrop rejected Bougeant's theory of demonic animation but agreed with his criticism of explanations that reduced animal behaviour to mechanism or an undefined instinct. He also opposed the Cartesian conception of animals as automata. Hildrop argued that training a horse or dog through reward and punishment would make little sense if an animal possessed no capacity to understand or learn, comparing such treatment to rewarding or punishing a clock for keeping time.

== Contents ==
The work consists of two letters addressed to an unnamed woman. Hildrop considers the understanding of animals, their ability to communicate, the nature of their souls and their place within Christian accounts of creation and the Fall of man.

Hildrop argued that animal vocalisations were intentional forms of communication rather than involuntary effects of instinct. According to Malcolm Hay, Hildrop regarded animal signs as expressions of rationally formed desires, directed towards particular recipients in order to produce a response. Hildrop therefore treated animal communication as sharing characteristics with human language.

He also disputed the sharp distinction between human and animal rationality. In addition to criticising Cartesian mechanism, Hildrop criticised John Locke's discussion of animal rationality in An Essay Concerning Human Understanding, questioning why rationality in animals should be attributed to a fundamentally different cause from rationality in humans.

Hildrop's theological explanation for the condition of animals connected their fate with that of humanity. He argued that animals had originally been intended to share in the blessings of creation and immortality, but that the disobedience of humanity in the Fall had affected the rest of creation. He consequently regarded the present condition of animal souls as degraded through the Fall of man. Hildrop did not claim to demonstrate conclusively that animal souls were immortal, but argued that if the human soul was incorruptible there was no evident reason to deny the same property to animals.

== Publication ==
Frontispiece to the first edition of Free Thoughts upon the Brute-Creation (1742), engraved by Michael van der Gucht

The first edition was printed in London for the bookseller and stationer R. Minors. It appeared in two separately paginated parts, with the first dated 1742 and the second 1743. The first part comprises 64 pages and the second 88 pages. The volume contains an engraved frontispiece by Michael van der Gucht depicting Adam and Eve among animals.

A third edition, retitled Free Thoughts upon the Brute-Creation: Wherein Father Bougeant's Philosophical Amusement, &c. is Examined, was published by Jacob Loyseau in 1751. The work was subsequently included in the first volume of The Miscellaneous Works of John Hildrop, D.D. (1754).

== Reception and influence ==
Andrew Linzey wrote that Free Thoughts upon the Brute-Creation directly challenged elements of Aristotelian and Thomistic accounts of animals and described it as one of the earliest sophisticated works advocating a more favourable view of their mental and moral status. David Perkins placed it among early arguments for animal rights and situated Hildrop's defence of animal souls alongside eighteenth-century discussions by writers including Alexander Pope, Joseph Butler and John Wesley.

Wesley later abridged Hildrop's book for The Arminian Magazine. The abridgement, published under the title "Free Thoughts on the Brute Creation", appeared in twelve instalments during 1783. Wesley described Hildrop's argument as a defence of the wisdom and goodness of God in relation to animals.

== See also ==
- Animal consciousness
- Animal language
- Moral status of animals
- Christianity and animal rights
- Problem of evil § Problem of evil and animal suffering
- History of animal rights
- An Essay on Humanity to Animals
