= Old Grammar School =

Old Grammar School is the name of:

- Old Grammar School, Coventry in the West Midlands, England
- Old Grammar School, Derby in Derbyshire, England
- Old Grammar School, Skipton in North Yorkshire, England
- Old Grammar School, Thornton-le-Dale in North Yorkshire, England
- Old Grammar School, Wath in North Yorkshire, England
