= Blacking =

Blacking may refer to:

- Blacking (polish), a nineteenth-century shoe polish
- Blacking up, putting on a style of theatrical makeup to take on the appearance of certain archetypes of American racism
- Blacking (cryptography) In NSA jargon, encryption devices are often called blackers, because they convert red signals to black
- Sanitization (classified information)

== People with the surname ==
- John Blacking (1928–1990), British ethnomusicologist and anthropologist

== See also ==
- Blackening (disambiguation)
