= Old Grammar School, Wath =

Building in North Yorkshire, England

Old Grammar School
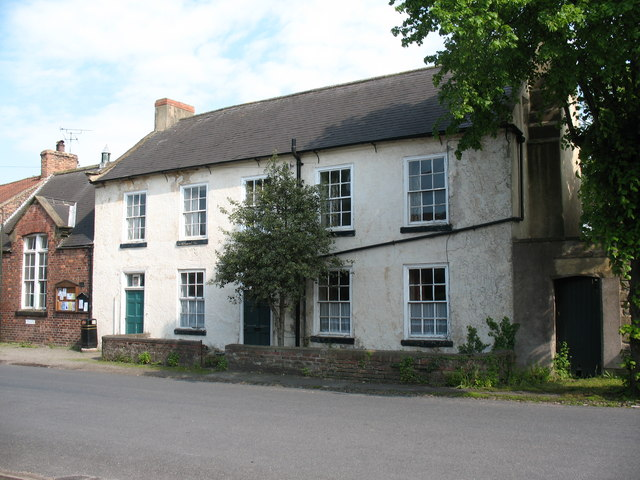
- The building in 2008

- Location within North Yorkshire

General information
- Type: Grammar school (former); House (current)
- Location: Main Street, Wath, North Yorkshire, England
- Coordinates: 54.1884°N 1.5050°W
- Year built: 1684
- Renovated: Mid-18th and 19th century (altered); 20th century (converted)

Listed Building – Grade II
- Official name: The Grammar School
- Designated: 19 November 1951
- Reference no.: 1173200

The Old Grammar School is a historic building on Main Street in Wath, a village near Ripon in North Yorkshire, England.

The building was constructed in 1684 as a grammar school, with funding from Peter Samwaies, the rector of St Mary's Church. The building was altered in the mid-18th century, and again in the 19th century. In the 20th century, it was converted into a house. The building was Grade II listed in 1951.

The building is constructed of roughcast stone, and has a roof of Westmorland slate with pantiles at the rear, stone coping and shaped kneelers. It has two storeys and is five bays wide. The central doorway has an architrave and a three-light fanlight, and above it is an inscription. The windows are sashes in architraves. At the rear is a two-light mullioned window and an outshut, and in the roof are four pairs of upper crucks.

== See also ==
- Listed buildings in Wath (near Ripon)
