= An Essay on Humanity to Animals =

1798 book by Thomas Young

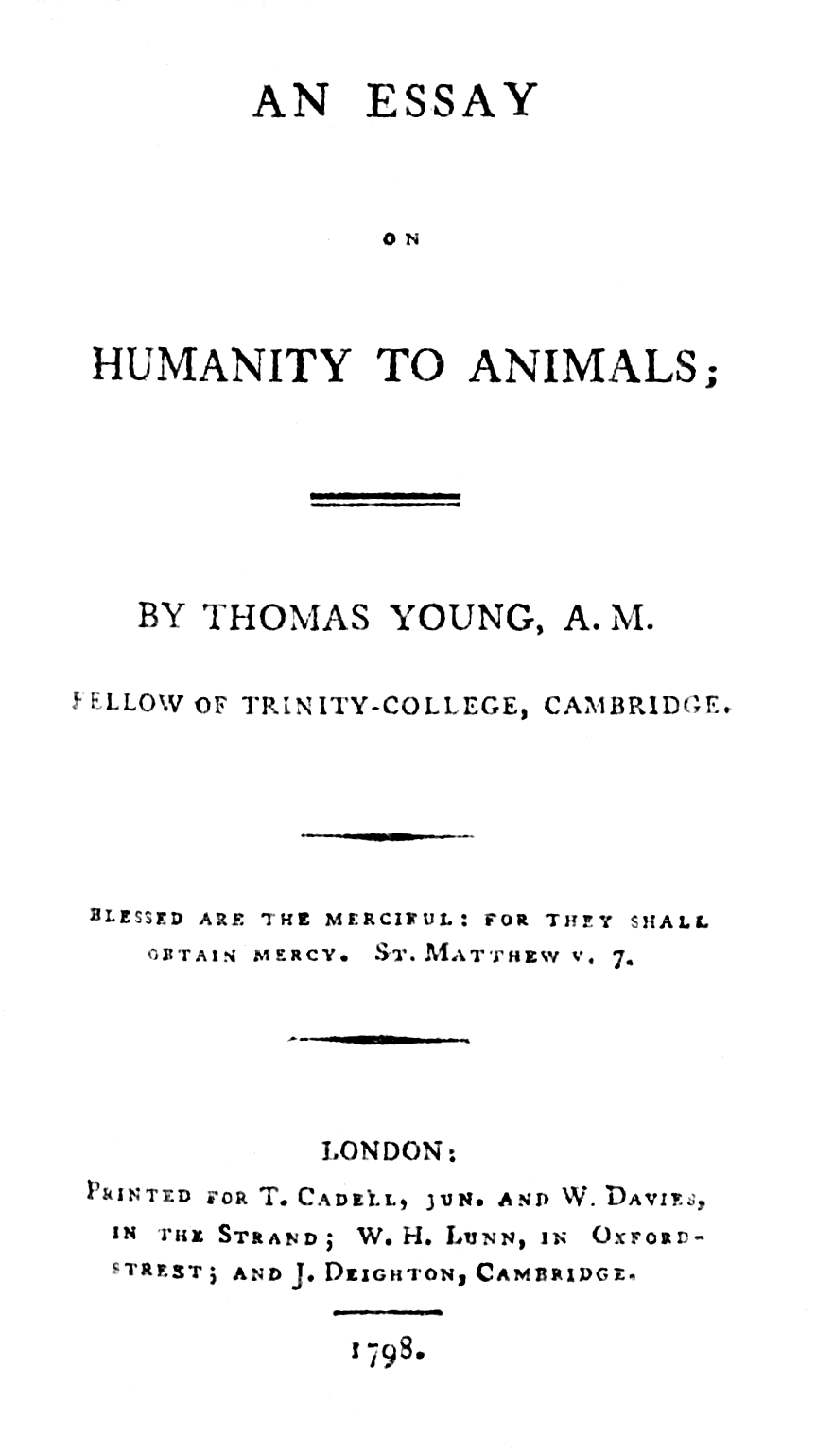
- First edition title page
- Author: Thomas Young
- Language: English
- Subjects: Animal theology; animal ethics; animal rights; animal welfare; Christian ethics
- Genre: Essay
- Publisher: T. Cadell, jun. and W. Davies
- Publication date: 9 March 1798
- Publication place: Kingdom of Great Britain
- Media type: Print (hardcover)
- Pages: 202
- OCLC: 1422462229
- Text: An Essay on Humanity to Animals at HathiTrust

An Essay on Humanity to Animals is a 1798 book by the English theologian and writer Thomas Young on the moral and theological status of non-human animals. Written while Young was a fellow of Trinity College, Cambridge, it combines animal ethics and animal theology, arguing that humans have a moral duty to treat animals humanely and to avoid unnecessary cruelty. Young bases this duty on animals' capacity for pleasure and pain, natural law, and Christian teaching. The book also discusses blood sports, hunting, fishing, the treatment of horses and dogs, cruelty in food production, and the moral education of children.

It was favourably reviewed in several contemporary periodicals and has later been discussed in histories of animal welfare and animal rights.

== Background ==
Thomas Young was educated at Trinity College, Cambridge, where he matriculated in 1790 and graduated as 12th Wrangler in 1794. He later became a fellow of the college, and served as a tutor and senior dean. In 1813, he was appointed rector of Gilling East, Yorkshire, a post he held until his death in 1835.

An Essay on Humanity to Animals was published in 1798, while Young was still a fellow of Trinity College, Cambridge.

== Publication history ==
The book was published on 9 March 1798 by T. Cadell, jun. and W. Davies in the Strand, London, with additional distribution by W. H. Lunn in Oxford Street and J. Deighton in Cambridge. An abridged edition was published in 1804 by Knott and Lloyd in Birmingham.

In 2001, an edited edition prepared by Rod Preece was published by Edwin Mellen Press. It included an introduction and annotations by Preece, with a foreword by David Fraser.

== Contents ==
Animals are endued with a capability of perceiving pleasure and pain; and from the abundant provision which we perceive in the world for the gratification of their several senses, we must conclude that the Creator wills the happiness of these his creatures, and consequently that humanity towards them is agreeable to him, and cruelty the contrary. This, I take it, is the foundation of the Rights of animals, as far as they can be traced independently of scripture; and is, even by itself, decisive on the subject, being the same sort of argument as that on which moralists found the Rights of Mankind, as deduced from the Light of Nature.

— Thomas Young, An Essay on Humanity to Animals, p. 8.

The volume is prefixed by an "Ode to Humanity" by the Reverend C. Hoyle of Trinity College, Cambridge, written at Young's request. The main text is arranged in chapters dealing with different forms of cruelty to animals and with the duties humans owe them.

Young argues at the outset that animals are capable of pleasure and pain, and that this capacity places them within the scope of moral concern. He links cruelty to animals with broader habits of violence and coarseness, and holds that humane treatment is required both by natural law and by Christian ethics.

Several chapters attack forms of cruelty practised for entertainment. Young condemns blood sports such as bull-baiting and cockfighting, as well as hunting, shooting, and fishing for amusement. He also argues that children should be taught from an early age not to torment animals, since cruelty in youth may harden the character.

Young also discusses everyday treatment of animals. He gives particular attention to horses, which he describes as useful and often badly used, and he criticises overwork, mutilation, and neglect. Elsewhere he objects to the confinement of wild animals for amusement and to cruel practices in food production, including the treatment of fish and bees. In the closing parts of the book he turns to dogs and other domestic animals, urging readers to repay their dependence and attachment with care rather than abuse.

== Reception ==
The Monthly Review commended An Essay on Humanity to Animals for its eloquence and moral purpose, drawing attention to passages intended to arouse compassion, including an account of a polar bear protecting her cubs. It described the work as a persuasive appeal for humane treatment of animals.

The Monthly Mirror recommended the book to readers engaged in pursuits such as horse racing and cockfighting, and noted its lively style, zoological examples, and emphasis on animals' capacity for suffering.

The British Critic described the work as benevolent and morally serious, though it remarked on what it considered occasional over-refinement. It especially recommended the book to those responsible for children's education, endorsed its criticism of practices such as bird-netting, hunting, and cockfighting, and praised the introductory "Ode to Humanity".

== Legacy ==
In a chapter in The Oxford Handbook of Animal Ethics, Aaron Garrett places Young's book alongside works by writers such as John Lawrence as part of a move toward more practical arguments for animal protection, connected with wider reform movements of the period.

Henry S. Salt listed An Essay on Humanity to Animals in the bibliography of Animals' Rights: Considered in Relation to Social Progress. Benjamin Bryan quoted from it in Anti-Vivisection Evidences (1895), and Edward Payson Evans included it in the bibliography of Evolutional Ethics and Animal Psychology (1898). In 1989, Charles R. Magel listed it in Keyguide to Information Sources in Animal Rights.

According to Rod Preece, John Styles's The Animal Creation: Its Claims on Our Humanity Stated and Enforced appears to have drawn heavily on Young's earlier writings. Preece also compares Young with church writers on animal treatment such as Richard Dean and Humphrey Primatt.

In 2013, the American Philosophical Society Library included Young's work in a web exhibit on the history of animal studies.

== See also ==
- Christianity and animal rights
- Problem of evil § Problem of evil and animal suffering
- Christian vegetarianism
- History of animal rights
- History of animal welfare
- Free Thoughts upon the Brute-Creation
