= John Styles =

English minister and writer (1782–1849)

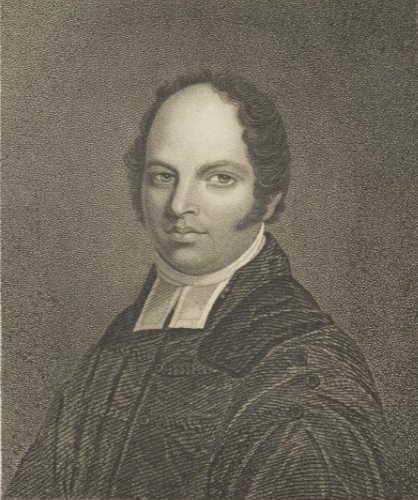
- Born: 17 March 1782; Thrandeston, England
- Died: 22 June 1849 (aged 67); Kennington, England
- Education: Aberdeen University
- Occupations: Congregational minister, writer

John Styles (17 March 1782 – 22 June 1849) was an English Congregational minister, biographer and animal welfare writer. While he is in many places described as a Methodist, the notices in the Evangelical Magazine to which he contributed appearing after his death make no mention of that.

== Biography ==
Styles was born at Thrandeston, Suffolk. The family moved to Islington when he was about six. He was influenced by Thomas Wills at Islington Chapel, and made his way to nonconformist services of the ministers Nathaniel Jennings at Lothbury and Joseph Barber at Aldermanbury. He was a student at Hoxton College.

Before the age of 20 Styles entered the ministry at Newport, Isle of Wight. During his career he was a pastor of an Independent church at Brighton, which he left in 1823 for Kennington. He had had Holland Chapel, North Brixton built, but in 1835 his congregation had to move after the mortgage costs required it to be sold.

Styles then had Claylands Chapel built in Clapham. He remained there to 1844. From around 1844 he was pastor at Foleshill, near Coventry.

Styles was awarded the degree of Doctor of Divinity in 1844 by Aberdeen University. He died at Kennington on 22 June 1849.

== Works ==
In 1837, the Society for the Prevention of Cruelty to Animals (SPCA) sponsored an essay competition, with a prize of £100, for the best essay encouraging greater kindness to animals (illustrating "the obligations of humanity as due to the brute creation"). Styles won the competition with his essay The Animal Creation: Its Claims on Our Humanity Stated and Enforced, an early work on animal welfare. Rod Preece described Styles as an early church animal welfare proponent.

Styles based his arguments on Christian principles from the Bible, arguing that animals feel pain and suffer as humans do and that because God has given humans dominion over animals, they should treat them with benevolence and mercy. Anna Feuerstein has noted that "Styles compares humans to a shepherd, positioning animal welfare as pastoral power". The book was positively reviewed in The Herald of Peace and The Monthly Review.

Styles opposed all forms of hunting and vivisection. He was not a vegetarian, but did criticise the luxuries of meat-eating. Preece has suggested that Styles plagiarised from An Essay on Humanity to Animals (1798), by Thomas Young (1772–1835) of Trinity College, Cambridge, and that the SPCA jury did not notice the borrowings.

=== Publications ===
- A tribute to the memory of Nelson (1805), sermon. It was critical of venality in the Pitt ministry, naming Henry Dundas, 1st Viscount Melville.
- An Essay on the Character and Influence of the Stage on Morals and Happiness (1807). Samuel Claggett Chew wrote that Styles "carries on the tradition of Tertullian and Grosseteste, Prynne and Collier."
- Strictures on two critiques in the Edinburgh Review, on the subject of Methodism and Missions (1808) This was a reply to opinions of Sydney Smith on what he called "three classes of fanatics." Smith made an ad hominem attack on Styles the following year. Henry Thomas Buckle commented on the Edinburgh Reviews vehement pursuit of evangelical authors: "Such writers as Hannah More and John Styles could feel the lash, though they could not understand the argument." In 1856, an anonymous review "Sydney Smith as a minister of religion", in the Princeton Review, described the work of Styles as a "stern and lofty rebuke".
- The Life of David Brainerd (1808), adapted work on the missionary David Brainerd
- The Characteristic Principles of the Gospel Illustrated and Defended (1810)

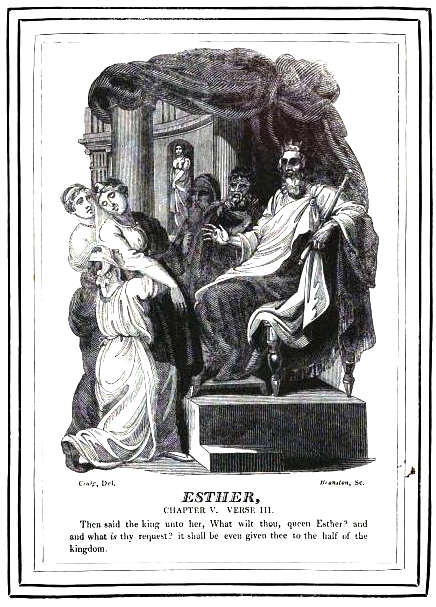
Illustration of the Book of Esther from Baxter's Bible

- The Complete Family Bible (1812, 2 vols.), annotations. Published by John Baxter, it was known as "Baxter's Bible", and sold particularly well in the United States.
- Sermons on various subjects (1813), with dedication to Isaac Buxton, "the friend and guide of my youth"; includes an 1811 funeral sermon for Thomas Spencer.
- The Temptations of a Watering-Place (1815)
- The Legend of the Velvet Cushion (1815), pseudonymous, as Jeremiah Ringletub. It was an answer to The Velvet Cushion (1814) by John William Cunningham, on English church history.
- Memoirs and Remains of the Late Rev. Charles Buck (1817), on Charles Buck
- Lord Byron's works (1824)
- Early Blossoms: Or Biographical Notices of Individuals Distinguished by Their Genius and Attainments, who Died in Their Youth (1819)
- Memoirs of the Life of the Right Hon. George Canning (1828)
- The Animal Creation: Its Claims on Our Humanity Stated and Enforced (1839). There was a pamphlet reply by Grantley Berkeley, an opponent of game laws reform.
- Pulpit studies: or aids to preaching and meditation, chiefly narratives and facts (1839), anonymous

== See also ==
- John Baxter
