= Blakeney =

Blakeney may refer to:

== People ==
- Blakeney (surname)

== Places ==
=== England ===
- Blakeney, Gloucestershire, a village
- Blakeney, Norfolk, a village and civil parish
  - Blakeney Point, a nature reserve

=== North America ===
- Blakeney, Ontario, Canada
- Blakeney, Texas, United States, see National Register of Historic Places listings in Red River County, Texas
- Blakeney Lake, Nova Scotia, Canada

== Other uses ==
- Sir Percy Blakeney, hero of the novel The Scarlet Pimpernel, by Baroness Orczy
- Blakeney (horse), winner of the 1969 Epsom Derby

== See also ==
- Blackening (disambiguation)
- Blakeley (disambiguation)
- Blakely (disambiguation)
