= Blakely (surname) =

Blakely is an English and Scottish surname. Notable people with the surname include:

- Allison Blakely, American historian
- Antonio Blakeney (born 1996), American basketball player
- Charles Adams Blakely (1879–1950), American admiral
- Colin Blakely (1930–1987), British actor
- Diann Blakely (1957–2014), American poet, essayist, and reviewer
- Ebenezer Blakely (1806–1889), New York politician
- Ed Blakely (1938–2025), American politician and academic
- John Blakely (born 1947), English pianist
- John Russell Young Blakely (1872–1942), American admiral
- Linc Blakely (1912–1976), American baseball player
- Luke Blakely (born 1988), Antiguan footballer
- Margot Blakely (born 1950), New Zealand alpine skier
- Marqus Blakely (born 1988), American basketball player
- Mary Kay Blakely (1948–2023), American feminist writer
- Matthew Blakely, Australian potter
- Rachel Blakely (born 1968), Australian actress
- Ross H. Blakely, (1963–1922), American politician
- Sara Blakely (born 1971), American businessperson
- Stuart Blakely (born 1956), New Zealand alpine skier
- Susan Blakely (born 1948), American actress
- Theophilus Alexander Blakely (1827–1868), inventor of the Blakely rifle
- Tom Blakely, American politician
- William Blakely (William Faris Blakely - botanist abbreviation: Blakely) (1875–1941), Australian botanist
- William G. Blakely (1829–1920), American politician
- Zelma Blakely (1921–1978), British artist

== See also ==
- Blakeley (surname)
- Blakley
