= Blamire Young =

English-Australian artist (1862–1935)

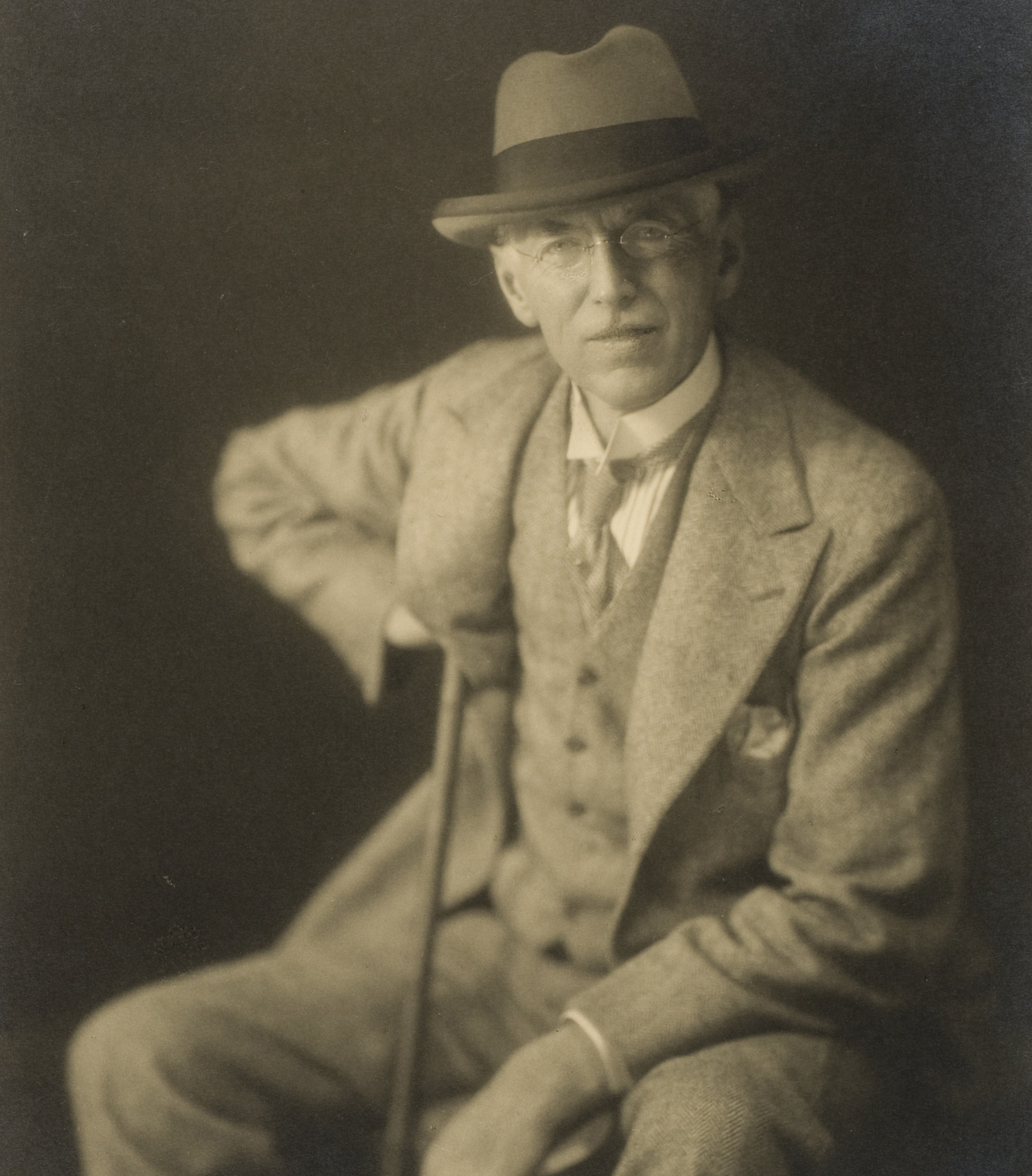
- Portrait of artist William Blamire Young, Melbourne, 1924
- Born: William Blamire Young; 9 August 1862; Londesborough, Yorkshire, England
- Died: 14 January 1935 (aged 72)
- Occupations: artist, war artist, stamp artist
- Relatives: Thomas Young (grandfather)

William Blamire Young (9 August 1862 – 14 January 1935), commonly known as Blamire Young, was an English-Australian artist and art critic. He painted primarily in watercolour.

== Biography ==
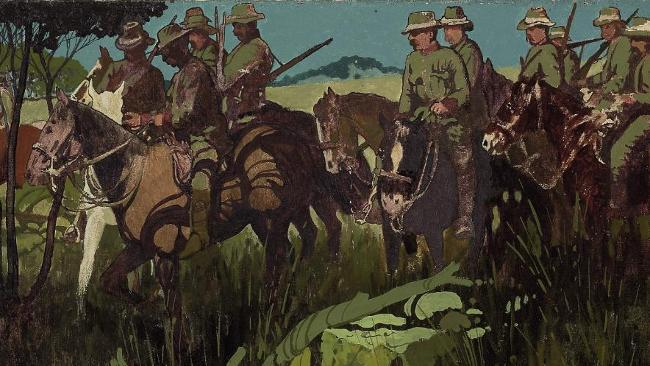
Blamire Young's VIIth Australian Light Horse Victorian Mounted Rifles (1904)

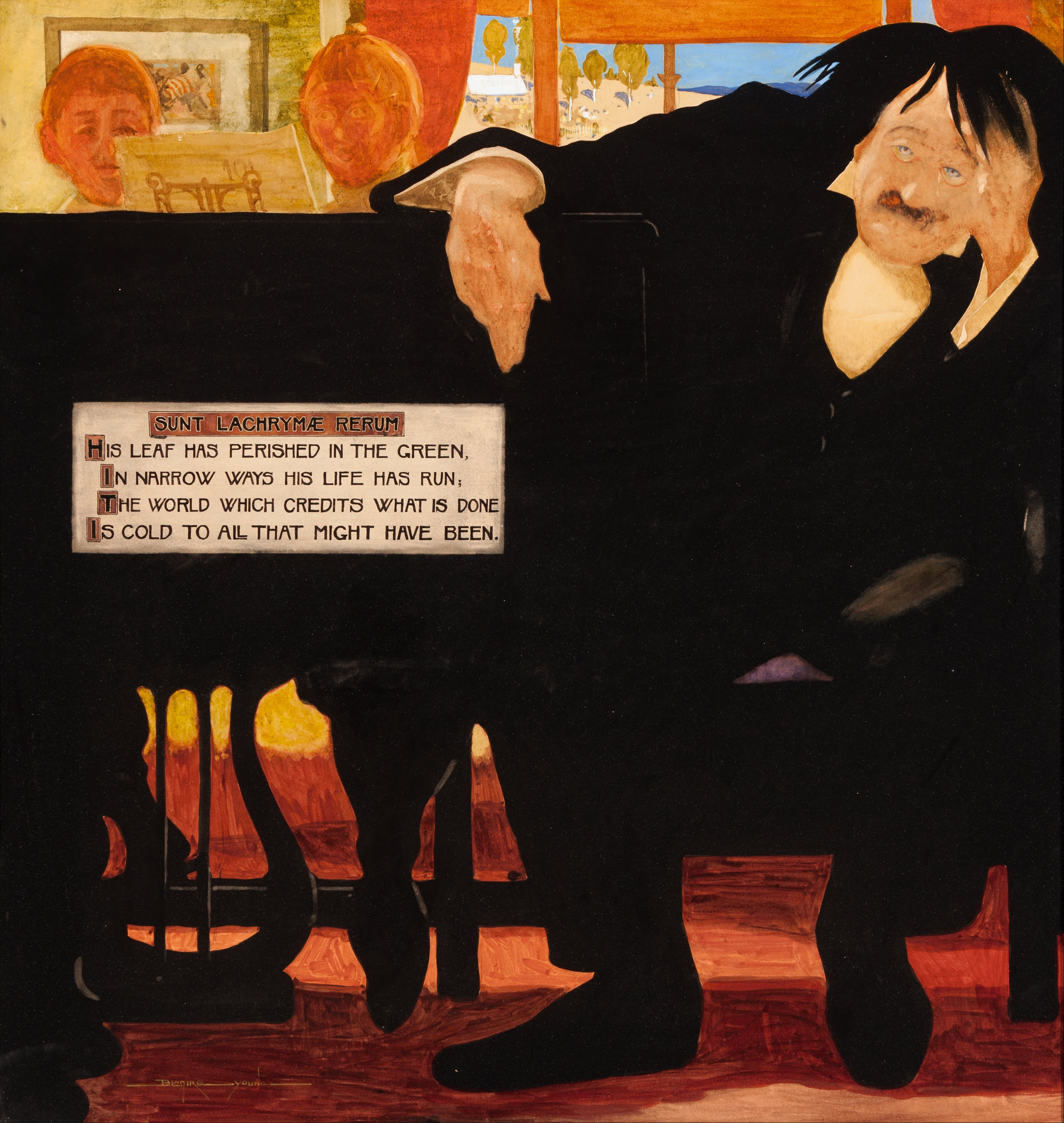
The musician (1901)

In 1903 he won the competition for the design of the Great Seal of Australia, with his design used until 1973.

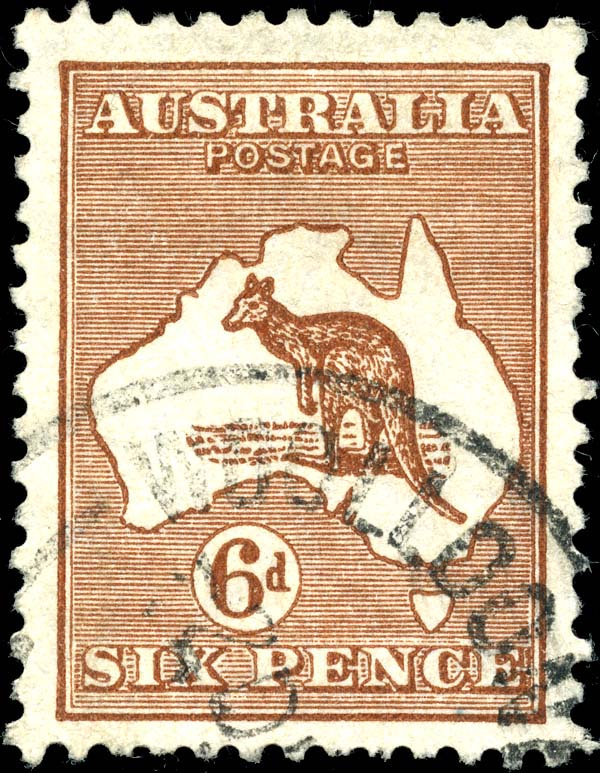
Kangaroo and Map stamp design by Blamire Young

In 1911 he was commissioned by the Postmaster-General of Australia, C E Frazer, to produce new designs for the first Commonwealth of Australia stamps. He submitted the designs in January 1912. Three types of printed essays for the Kangaroo and Map stamps are known. This design was first issued on 2 January 1913 and continued to be in use till 1935 concurrently with other stamps. The design was also used on postal stationery envelopes, letter cards, registration envelopes and newspaper wrappers.

== Legacy ==
In 1976 he was honoured on a postage stamp issued by Australia Post for his work as designer of the first Australian postage stamp.

== Gallery ==
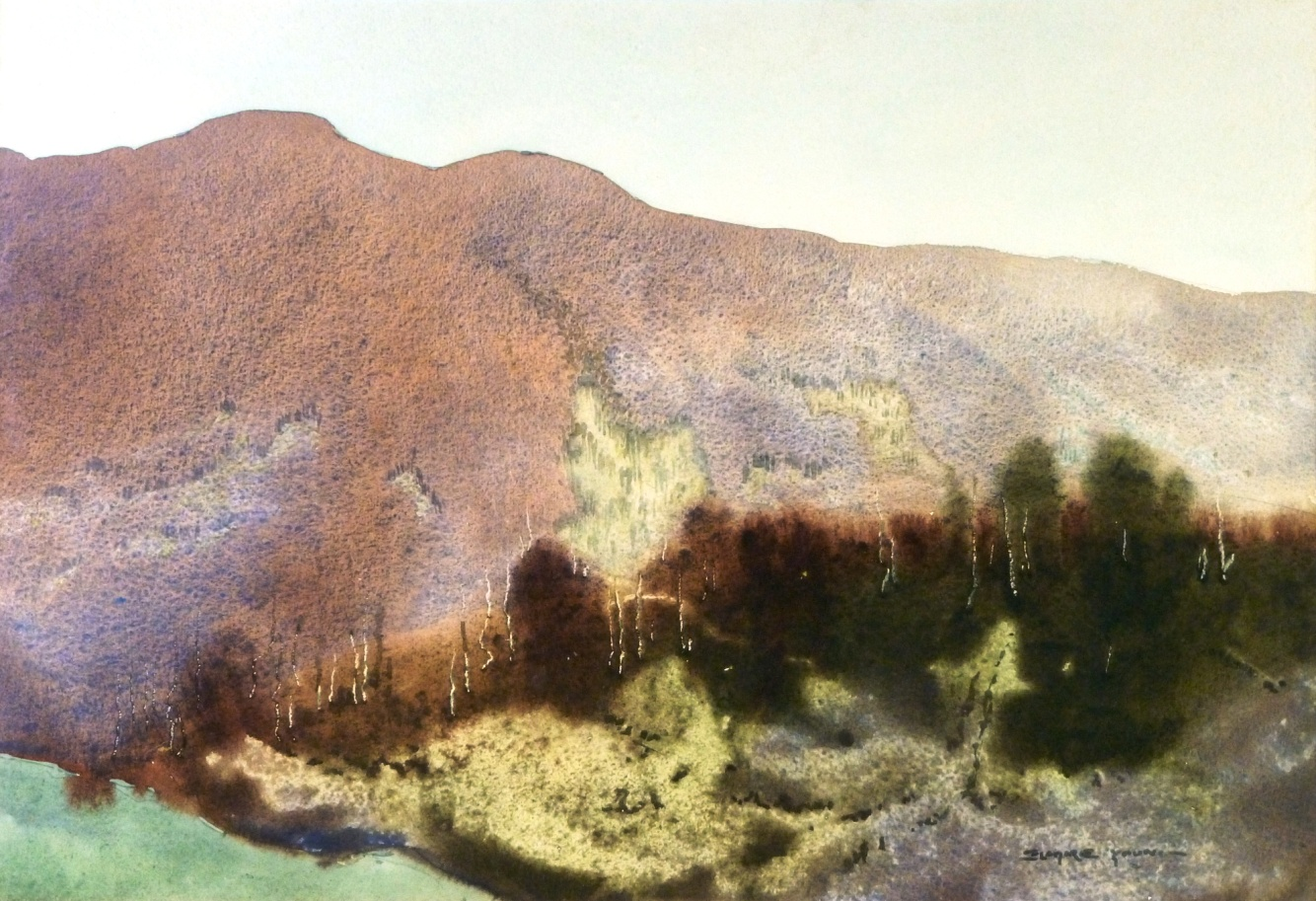
Autumn Morning (1913–34)

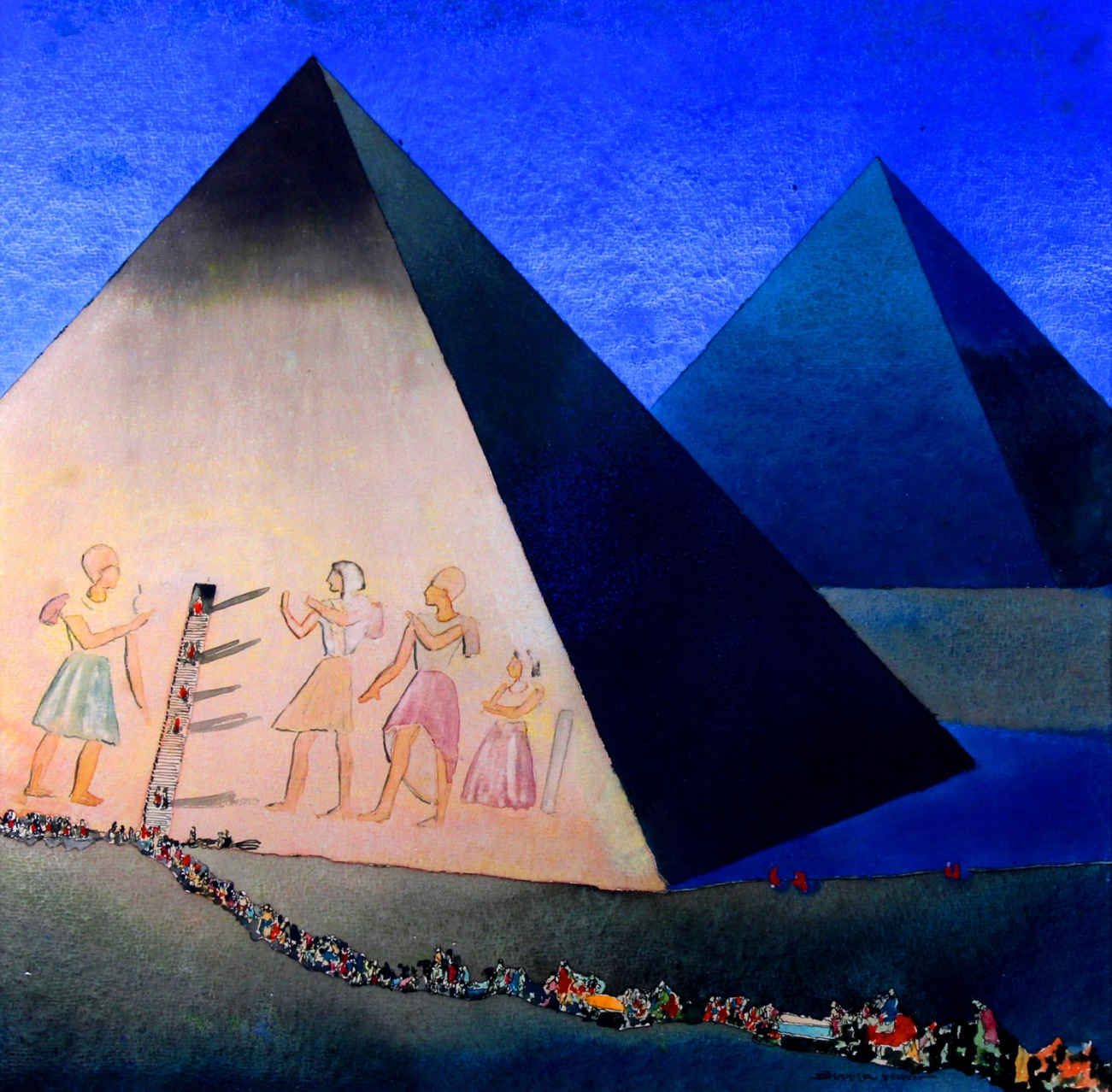
Rameses Ii Buries His Queen (1913–34)

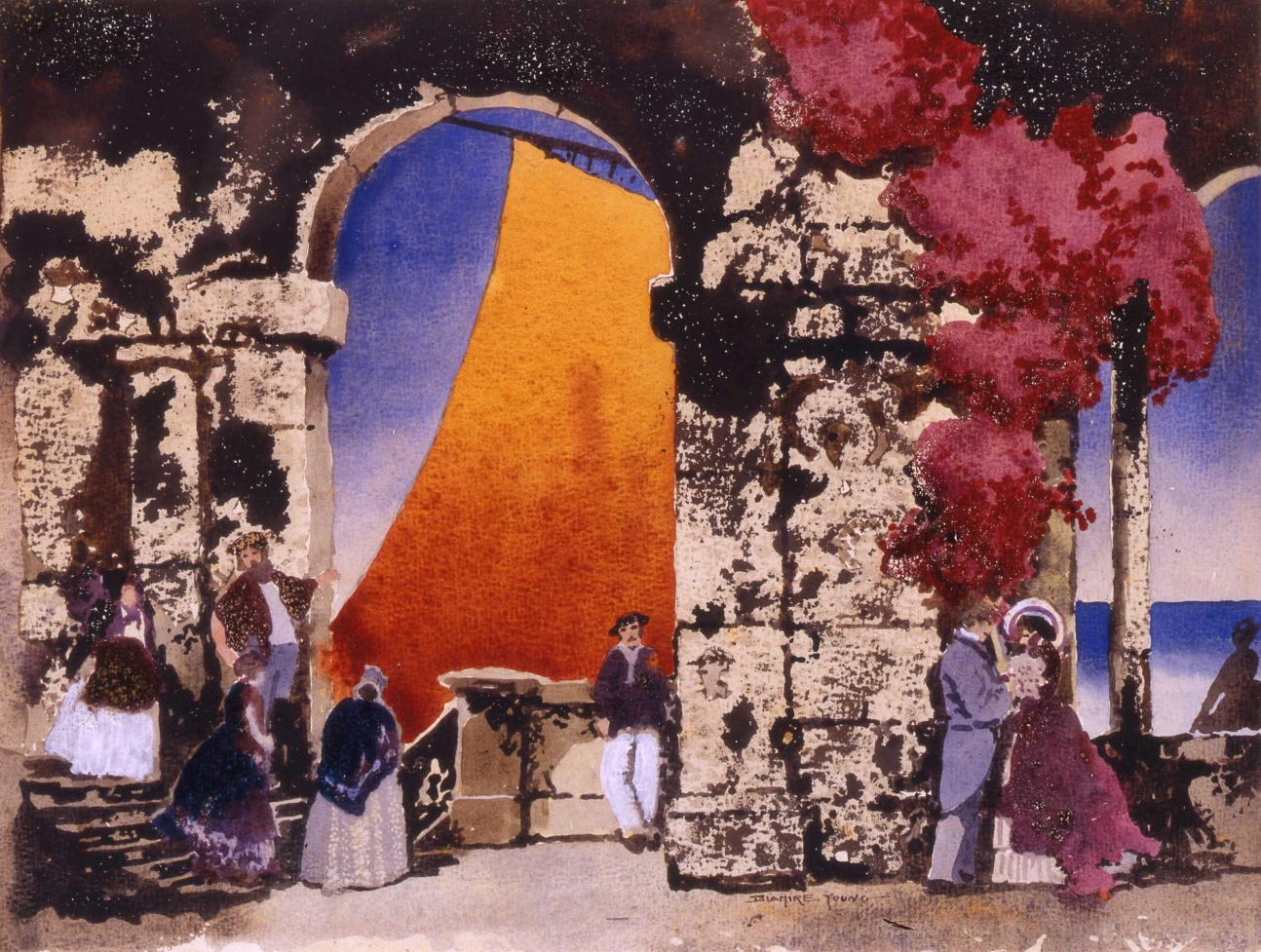
All Aboard (c.1928-1930)

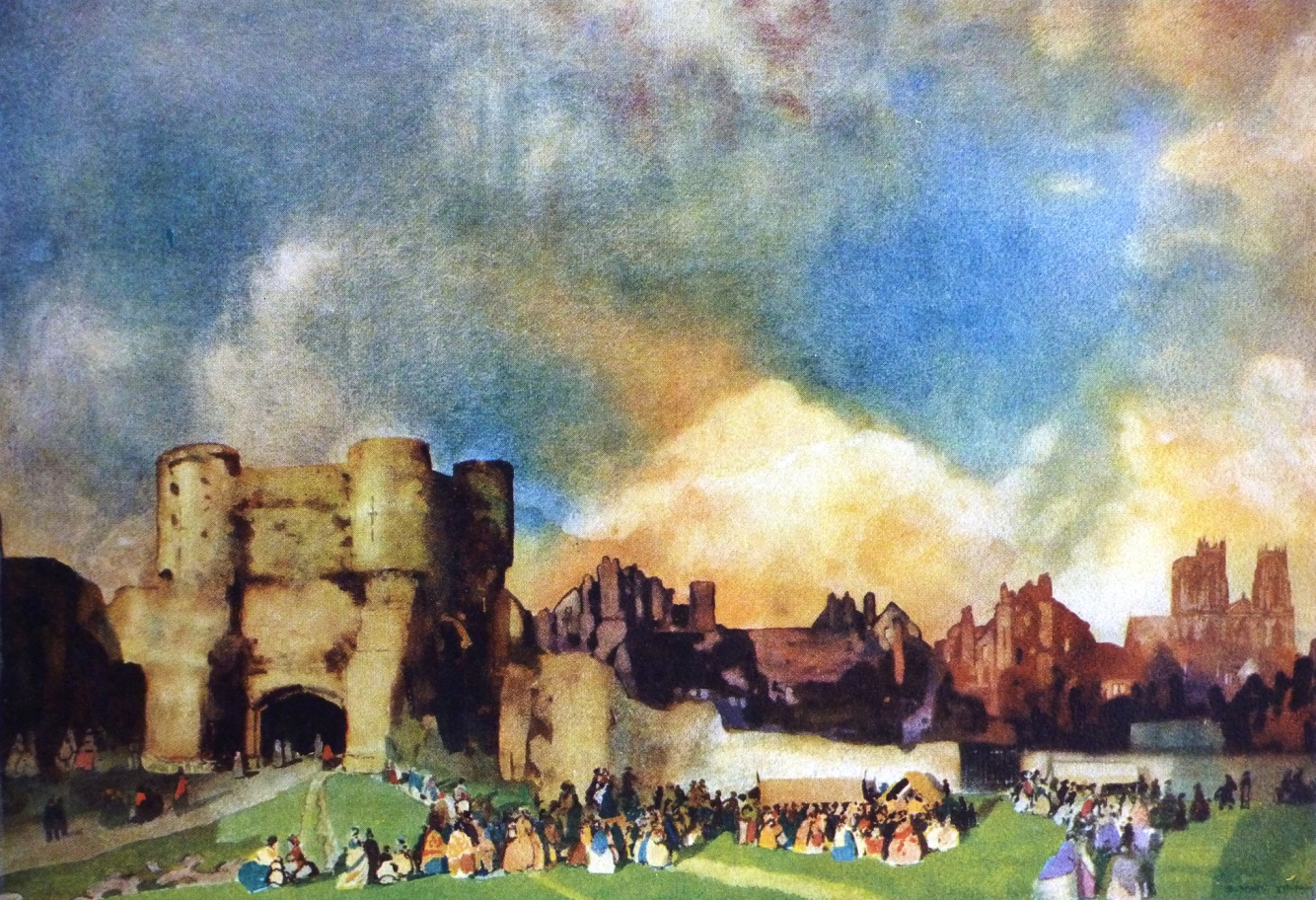
The Western Gate (c.1928-1930)

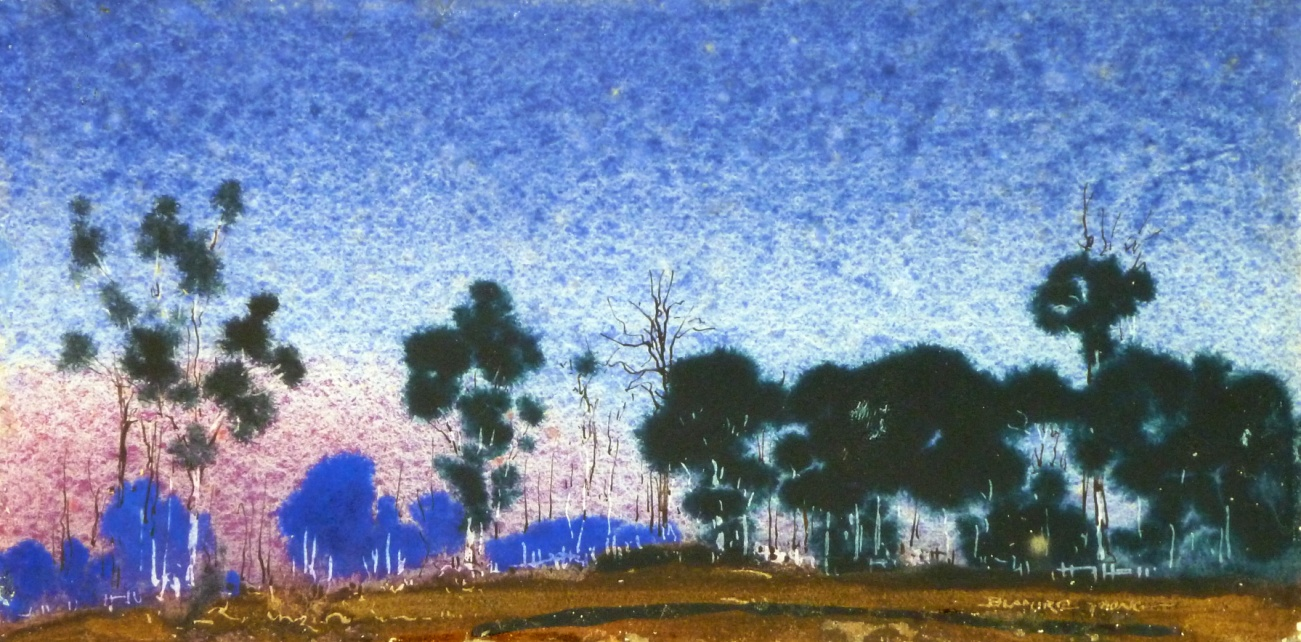
Summer Evening (c.1921–23)

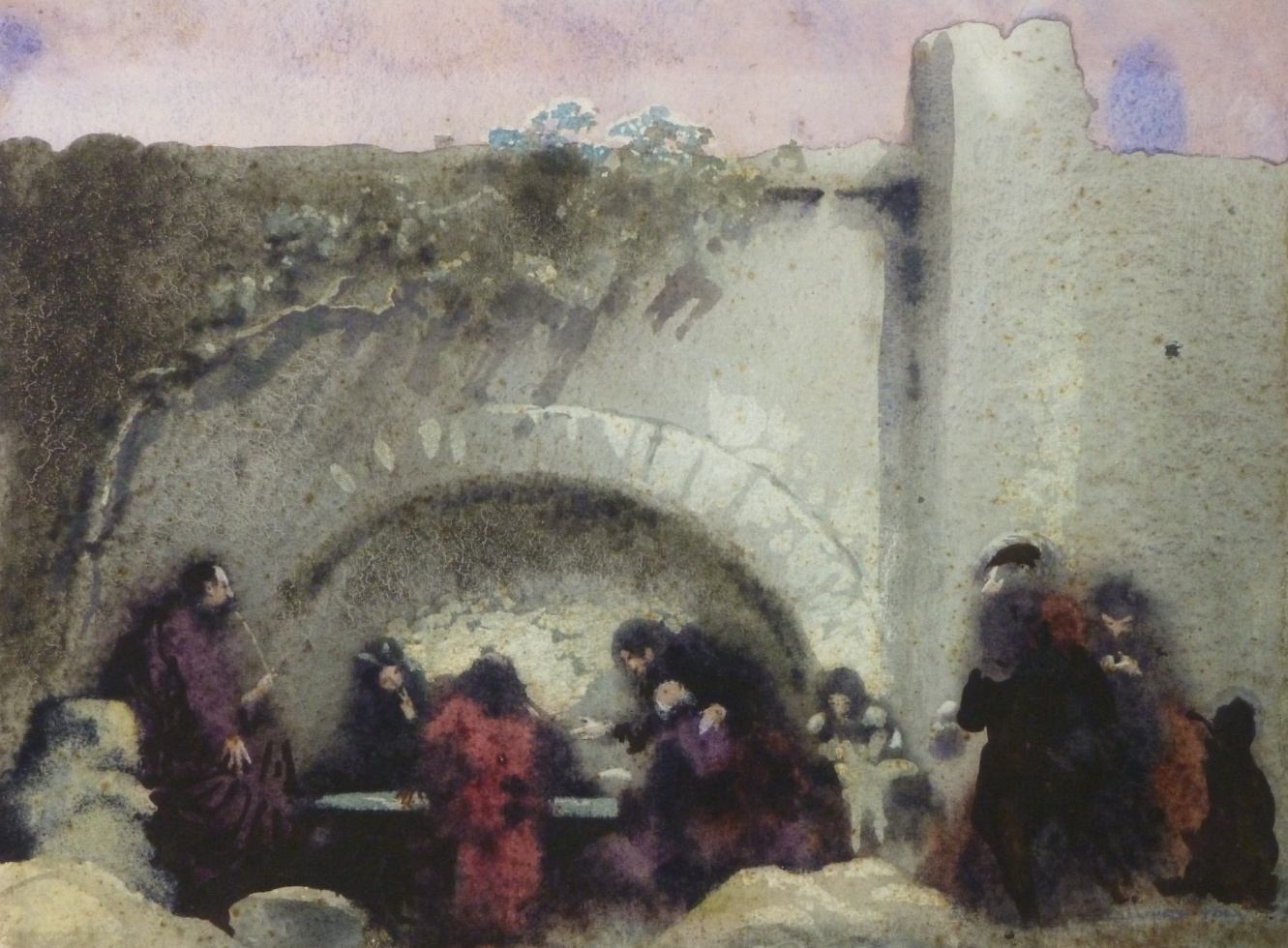
The Gamblers (c.1921–23)

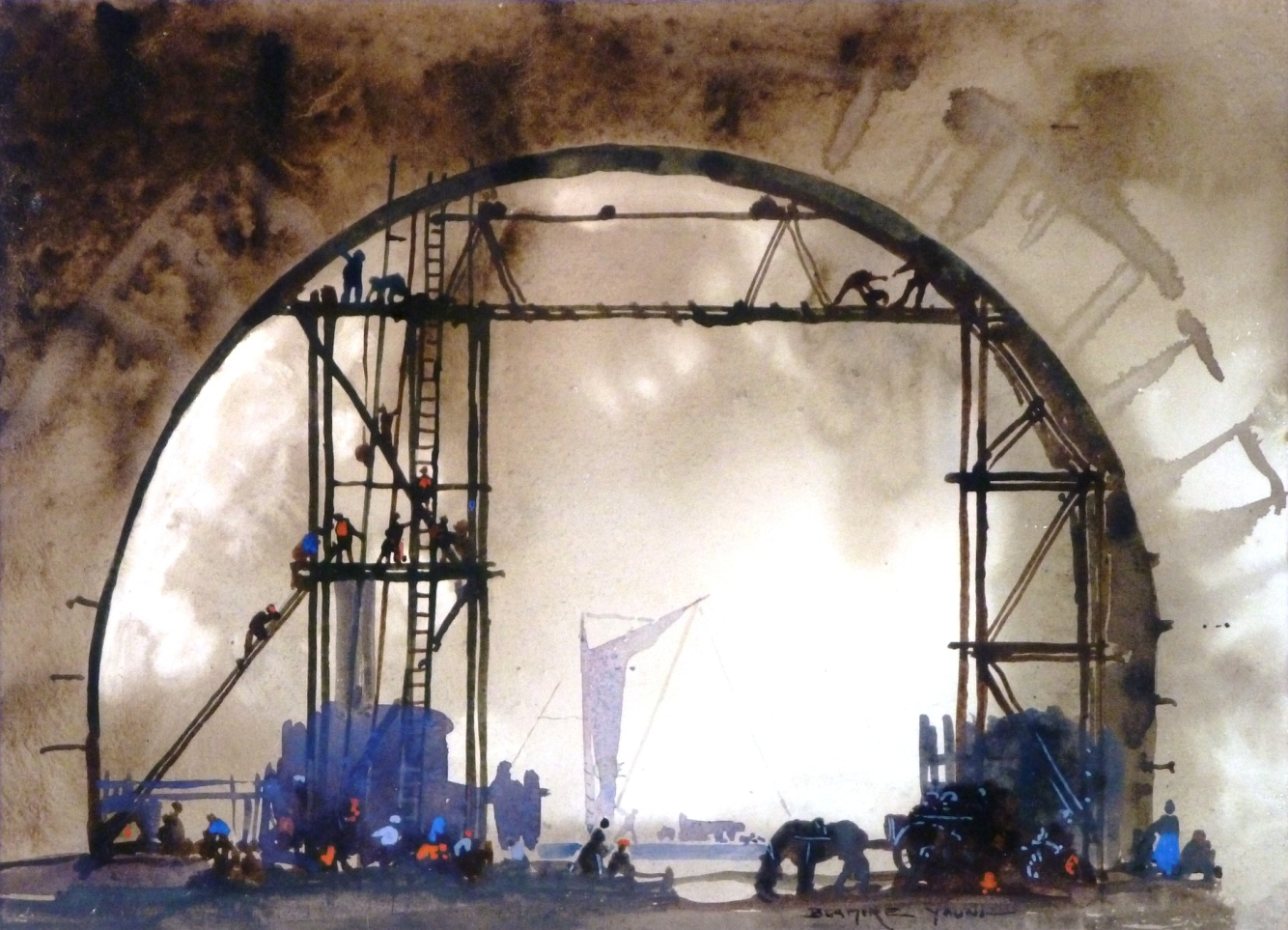
Repairing The Viaduct (c.1922–24)

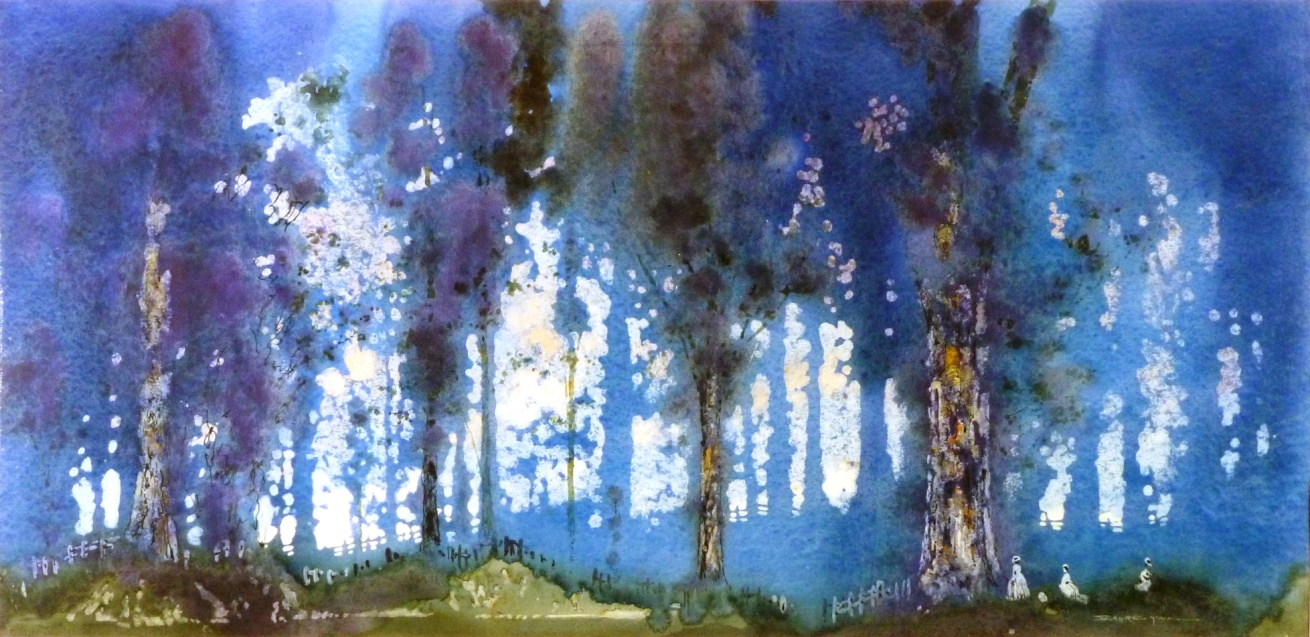
A Refuge From Reality (c.1924–26)

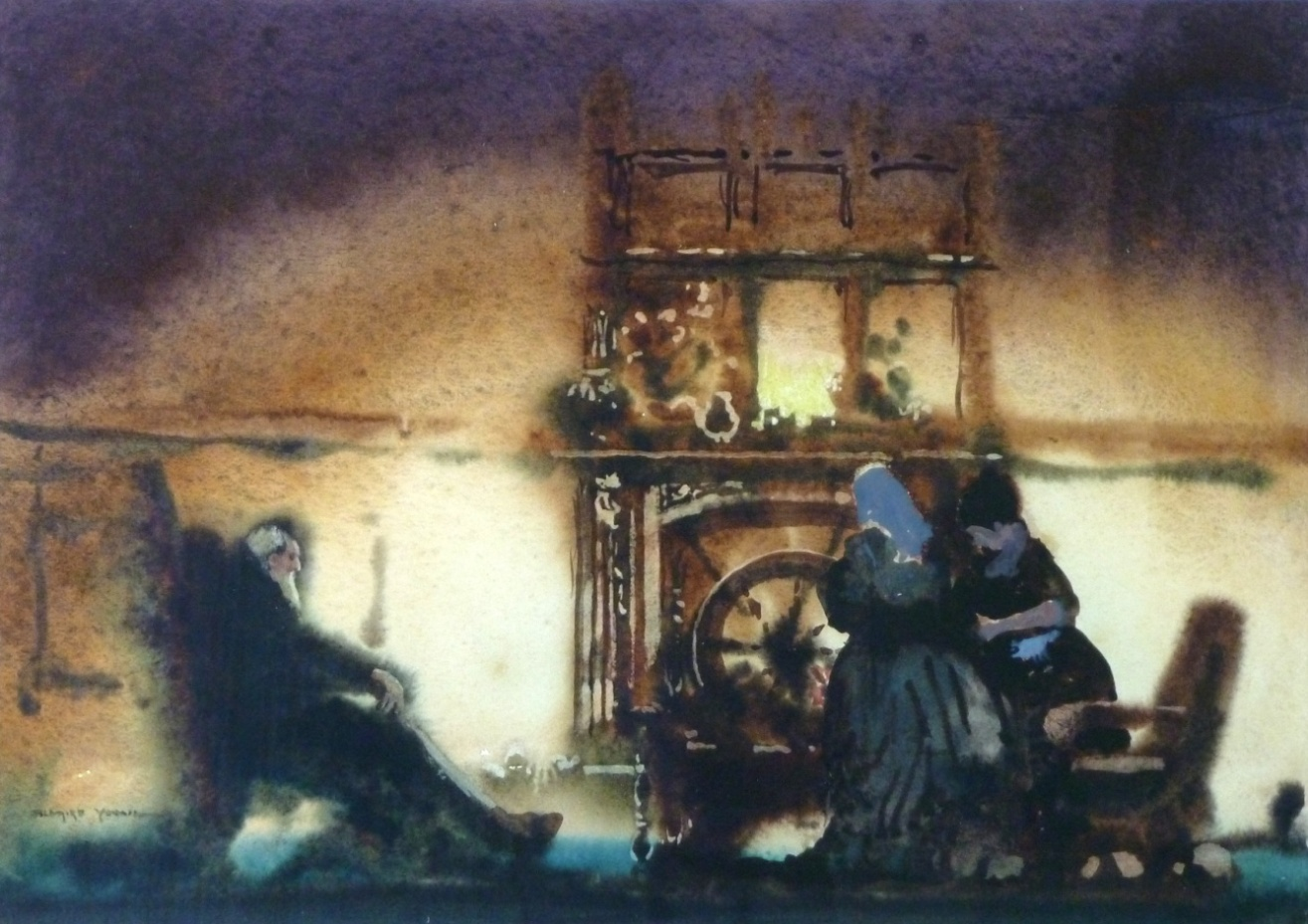
Sleep (c.1931–33)
