= Listed buildings in Wath (near Ripon) =

Wath (near Ripon) is a civil parish in the county of North Yorkshire, England. It contains 13 listed buildings that are recorded in the National Heritage List for England. Of these, one is listed at Grade II*, the middle of the three grades, and the others are at Grade II, the lowest grade. The parish contains the village of Wath and the surrounding area, and all the listed buildings are in the village. The most important building in the parish is a church, which is listed, together with items in the churchyard, and the other listed buildings include houses and associated structures, and a telephone kiosk.

== Key ==
Grade	Criteria
II*	Particularly important buildings of more than special interest
II	Buildings of national importance and special interest

== Buildings ==
Name and location	Photograph	Date	Notes	Grade
St Mary's Church; 54.18911°N 1.50332°W		13th century	The church has been altered and extended through the centuries, the tower was added in 1812, and there was a restoration in 1874. It is built in stone with cobbles, and consists of a nave, a south transept, a chancel with a north vestry and organ chamber, and a west tower. The tower has five stages, string courses, clock faces, two-light bell openings, and an embattled parapet with corner finials.	II*
Font south of St Mary's Church; 54.18904°N 1.50329°W	—	15th century (possible)	The font against the west wall of the south transept is in sandstone. It has a two-tier octagonal base, a stem with a square section and two bands of roll-moulding, and an octagonal bowl.	II
The Rectory; 54.18871°N 1.50309°W	—	16th century	The house, which has been altered, is in stone, with the entrance range in roughcast brick, and stone slate roofs. There is an irregular U-shaped plan, an entrance range with one storey and three bays, and flanking two-storey two-bay projecting wings with hipped roofs. On the entrance range is a doorway with a radial fanlight and sash windows, those in the ground floor with round-arched heads, and the ground floor openings in round-arched recesses. The upper floor windows have square heads.	II
The Grammar School; 54.18848°N 1.50498°W		17th century	A grammar school, later a private house, it is in roughcast stone, and has a roof of Westmorland slate with pantiles at the rear, stone coping and shaped kneelers. There are two storeys and five bays. The central doorway has an architrave and a three-light fanlight, and above it is an inscription. The windows are sashes in architraves. At the rear is a two-light mullioned window and an outshut, and in the roof are four pairs of upper crucks.	II
Garage west of The Grammar School; 54.18843°N 1.50512°W		17th century	A stable with a hayloft above, later used for other purposes, it is in sandstone with a pantile roof. There are two storeys and a single bay. On the front is a garage door, a small window to the left and another on the upper floor. At the rear is an arched doorway with a chamfered surround, flanked by small square windows.	II
Table tomb east of St Mary's Church; 54.18917°N 1.50293°W	—	Early 18th century	The table tomb is in sandstone. It has end panels with attached balusters, and two free-standing balusters in the centre supporting a flat slab.	II
Sundial south of St Mary's Church; 54.18898°N 1.50329°W	—	1735	The sundial to the south of the south door of the church is in stone. It consists of an inscribed pier about 1 metre (3 ft 3 in)in height, on a base, with a brass sundial.	II
Overthrow with lamp holder over south gateway, St Mary's Church; 54.18895°N 1.50304°W	—	18th century	The overthrow is in wrought iron. It consists of a flat-headed arch with C and S scrolls, and a square framework at the apex, and is fastened into the stone coping of the graveyard wall.	II
Overthrow with lamp holder over west gateway, St Mary's Church; 54.18900°N 1.50370°W	—	18th century	The overthrow is in wrought iron. It consists of a flat-headed arch with C and S scrolls, and a square framework at the apex, and is fastened into the stone coping of the graveyard wall.	II
Gates and gate piers, The Rectory; 54.18890°N 1.50309°W	—	18th century	The gate piers flanking the entrance to the drive are in stone. They have a square plan, they are about 2 metres (6 ft 7 in) in height, and each pier has a flat cornice and a ball finial. The gates are in wrought iron, about 1.75 metres (5 ft 9 in) in height, and have spear-headed standards and dogbars.	II
Ivy House; 54.18786°N 1.50634°W	—	Late 18th century	The house is in red-brown brick and it has a pantile roof. There are two storeys and three bays. The central doorway has an architrave and a segmental-arched head, and it is flanked by slightly protruding bow windows containing sashes. Above the doorway is a blind panel, it is flanked by horizontally sliding sash windows, and all have segmental brick arches.	II
Chest tomb south of St Mary's Church; 54.18903°N 1.50297°W	—	Early 19th century	The chest tomb is in sandstone, and has end panels, recessed sides, a flat top, and corner piers consisting of square reeded columns with rosettes on the capitals. The end panels have an urn with drapery in relief, and the recessed panels have a weathered inscription on the north side.	II
Telephone kiosk 54.18846°N 1.50514°W		1935	The telephone kiosk on High Street is of the K6 type designed by Giles Gilbert Scott. Constructed in cast iron with a square plan and a dome, it has three unperforated crowns in the top panels.	II
