= John Baxter (publisher) =

English printer and publisher

- Born: 20 October 1781; Rickhurst (Rykhurst), Alfold, Surrey, England
- Died: 12 November 1858 (aged 77)
- Occupations: printer, publisher, bookseller
- Notable work: Baxter's Bible; Lambert's Cricketer's Guide
- Children: George Baxter; William Baxter

John Baxter (1781–1858) was an English printer and publisher.

== Life ==
Baxter was born at Rickhurst (Rykhurst), Alfold, Surrey, on 20 October 1781. Early in life he settled in Lewes as a bookseller and printer. With his youngest son, William Baxter, he started the Sussex Agricultural Express. He was an enthusiastic cricketer, and the joint—if not the sole—author of the first ever book of rules for that sport, the first ever published, named Lambert's Cricketer's Guide, after the professional cricketer William Lambert.

Baxter died 12 November 1858. His second son, George Baxter, was the inventor of the process of printing in oil colours.

== Baxter's Bible ==
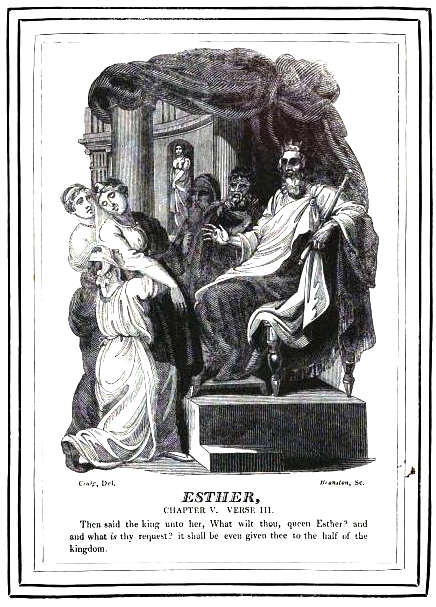
Illustration of the Book of Esther from Baxter's Bible, engraver Allen Robert Branston

Among the earliest of Baxter's enterprises was the publication of a large quarto Bible, annotated by the Rev. John Styles, D.D., and illustrated with wood engravings. This work, known as Baxter's Bible, sold well, especially in America.

== The Library of Agricultural and Horticultural Knowledge ==
The Library of Agricultural and Horticultural Knowledge had a very extensive circulation. It was published in 1830, with a second edition in 1832. George Sinclair wrote an article On the cultivation of the natural grasses for the publication. Other authors included John Ellman.
