= George Sinclair (horticulturist) =

Scottish gardener

George Sinclair (1787 – 13 March 1834) was a Scottish gardener.

== Biography ==
George Sinclair was born at Mellerstain in Berwickshire, where his father was gardener to the Hon. George Baillie of Jerviswood, and was baptised in the parish church of Earlston on 25 November 1787. He was the youngest of seven children born to Duncan Sinclair (1750–1833) and Christian Tait. Duncan Sinclair had been working at Mellerstain House for almost eight years when George was born and was to remain there until his death in 1833. George's uncle, Archibald Sinclair, was also a gardener and in 1791 began working at nearby Minto House; in the early 19th century he was employed as superintendent of the estate at Bonnington House near Lanark by Lady Mary Ross, a distant relative of George Baillie. Like his brother Duncan, Archibald remained a loyal servant there until his death, also in 1833. George and his brother, John, both continued in the family tradition and became gardeners. John was employed by the 7th Earl of Denbigh at Newnham Paddox in Warwickshire (1806–1815), and George was gardener to the 6th Duke of Bedford at Woburn Abbey in Bedfordshire from about 1807 until 1825, when he went into partnership as a seedsman with John Cormack and his son, John, at New Cross in Surrey.

== Horticultural work ==
By 1809 George Sinclair was conducting experiments at the direction of the Duke and also publishing papers. In 1813 he entered into a debate with Dr. William Richardson about fiorin grass in the Agricultural Magazine. He was a corresponding member of the Caledonian Horticultural Society in Edinburgh and read a paper there in March 1814 entitled On the prevention of the blight in fruit trees. He had struck up a friendship with Thomas Gibbs of Ampthill in Bedfordshire, who was seedsman to the Board of Agriculture and had premises in Half Moon Street Piccadilly and a nursery in Brompton. Sinclair corresponded with him regularly and purchased seeds and plants from him. Some of his letters refer to the experiments that he was conducting at Woburn Abbey under the guidance of Sir Humphry Davy to compare the performance of different species and various mixtures of grasses and herbs on different types of soil. These experiments and their results were published in an Appendix to Davy's Elements of Agricultural Chemistry in 1815. Sinclair had also consulted James Sowerby about the analysis of soils and submitted an advance copy of his publication on grasses to the 3rd Earl of Hardwicke for his opinion. Hortus gramineus Woburnensis was published in 1816, an expensive folio volume containing dried specimens of the grasses examined. Because of the herbarium specimens included, the work is categorised as resembling an exsiccata work. The specimens were replaced by plates in cheaper editions published in 1825, 1826, and 1829, and in a German translation by Frederick Schmidt of 1826. The nutritional value of the grasses as animal fodder was assessed through comparison of their water-soluble constituents. Between 1818 and 1820 Sinclair carried out experiments on the use of salt as manure for the growing of wheat which he described in a prize essay.

Sinclair also corresponded with Sir James Edward Smith, founder of the Linnean Society, about various plants. By 1823 he was a Fellow of the Horticultural Society where he read a paper on the Woburn perennial kale. On 26 March 1824 he became a fellow of the Linnean Society, having been elected by Joseph Sabine and the Duke of Bedford. In 1822 the Duke of Bedford had begun a comprehensive collection of exotic and indigenous heaths as a way of recuperating from a very severe illness. In his Introduction to Hortus ericaeus Woburnensis which was published in February 1825 the Duke states that the collection was completed under the superintendence of his former gardener, George Sinclair. In Hortus Woburnensis, written later by Sinclair's successor James Forbes, the design of the heath parterres at Woburn is also attributed to Sinclair, and in a letter to the Duke, Sir George Hayter, who did the illustrations for Hortus ericaeus, made reference to Sinclair as having shown him around the greenhouse and parterres and selecting the specimens to be illustrated. To find the best possible growing conditions for the collection of heaths Sinclair began collecting different types of heath soils and analysing their constituents. After several years of systematic investigation he concluded that they were made up mainly of humus, which derived from decayed leaves, and sand. He also collected calcareous soils from around Luton and Dunstable and experimented in mixing them with various proportions of peat and ashes to try to find a potting medium suitable for the more exotic specimens of heaths. However, this proved unsuccessful, and in Hortus ericaeus ... he recommended a natural heath soil for the growing of different species. By now Sinclair's brother, John, was working at Loddiges of Hackney where experimental work was being carried out in growing exotic species and in hybridisation. Sinclair purchased some of the Erica in the Woburn collection from here as well as personally collecting specimens from nurseries at Tooting (possibly William Rollison's Springfield Nursery), New Cross, Fulham, Woking, from George Whitworth of Acre House at Claxby by Normanby in Lincolnshire, and the Vineyard Nursery at Hammersmith, owned by James Lee and Lewis Kennedy. He also travelled to Southampton, where he bought hardy heaths from William Bridgewater Page, and to Bristol, where he made purchases of Cape Heaths from John Miller.

Benjamin Holdich, who was editor of the Farmer's Journal, was another acquaintance of Sinclair's, and as he lay dying he requested that Sinclair complete and publish his unfinished Essay on weeds. Sinclair duly wrote a preface and three of the four chapters based on Holdich's notes, and it was published in 1825. Sinclair donated the profits from the essay to Holdich's widow and family. Later that year he wrote a paper On cultivating a collection of grasses in pleasure grounds or flower gardens which was published in the Gardener's Magazine in 1826. In 1827 Sinclair submitted ideas for a treatise on planting to the Society for the Diffusion of Useful Knowledge, which was eventually published in 1832, and in 1828 he wrote a prize essay On the effects of bone manure on different soils for the Highland Society of Scotland. In 1829 James Forbes, Sinclair's successor at Woburn, published Salictum Woburnense, and in the Introduction by the Duke of Bedford Sinclair was credited with having initiated the idea of creating the collection of willows. In 1830 he wrote an article On the cultivation of the natural grasses for Baxter's Library of Agricultural and Horticultural Knowledge, and in 1831 he wrote a preface for and made additions to the 12th edition of James Donn's Hortus Cantabrigiensis.

In 1830 the Duke of Bedford built a new flower market at Covent Garden, and Sinclair took up a tenancy with his partner, John Cormack, in one of the conservatories there. He also had premises at 53, Regent Street. He continued to be busy with his writing, publishing papers for the Quarterly Journal of Agriculture and the Highland Society of Scotland, and with consultancy work on practical and scientific matters that concerned arboriculture, pastures, lawns, and agricultural and horticultural chemistry. He also carried out valuations of woods and plantations.

== Private life ==
Sinclair married Kennedy Gilmour, daughter of Thomas and Agnes Cockburn, also from the lowlands of Scotland. They were married 17 September 1817 in St. James Church in Piccadilly and had three children while living at Woburn; twin sons born in 1818, one of whom was named Wriothesley, in honour of the Duke of Bedford's son, and a daughter, Elizabeth, born in 1820. Sadly Elizabeth died in 1833, the same year as Sinclair's father and uncle, and it is thought that these deaths caused a state of depression in Sinclair which contributed to his early death the following year. Sinclair died at New Cross on 13 March 1834 and was buried at St. Paul in Deptford on 21 March. Sinclair's son, Finlay Duncan, died a few years later. His son, Wriothesley, studied at Pembroke College, Oxford, but died of consumption in Kensington in June 1840.

== Significance ==
In his obituary, written by J.C. Loudon in the Gardener's Magazine, Sinclair's Hortus gramineus ... is described as the most important work of its kind ever published; he "will hold a conspicuous station in all future times, as the introducer of a new and improved system of laying down lands in grass." Throughout the 19th century it continued to be cited as a valuable reference in the cultivation of grass. In another obituary, published in the Quarterly Journal of Agriculture, G. W. Johnson wrote that Sinclair "must be classed amongst the great modern benefactors of agriculture."

More recently, in January 2002 environmental scientists Andy Hector and Rowan Hooper wrote a paper entitled Darwin and the First Ecological Experiment. In On the Origin of Species Darwin wrote, "It has been experimentally proved that if a plot of ground be sown with one species of grass, and a similar plot be sown with several distinct genera of grasses, a greater number of plants and a greater weight of dry herbage can thus be raised." He was in fact referring to the experiments conducted by Sinclair at Woburn Abbey. Despite some limitations Hector and Hooper described the experiments as impressive even by today's standards and believe that they influenced the development of Darwin's "principle of divergence" which preceded his theory of evolution by natural selection. They also believe that Sinclair's research predates all other ecological experiments that they know of.
