= Dent (fell) =

Fell in Cumbria, England

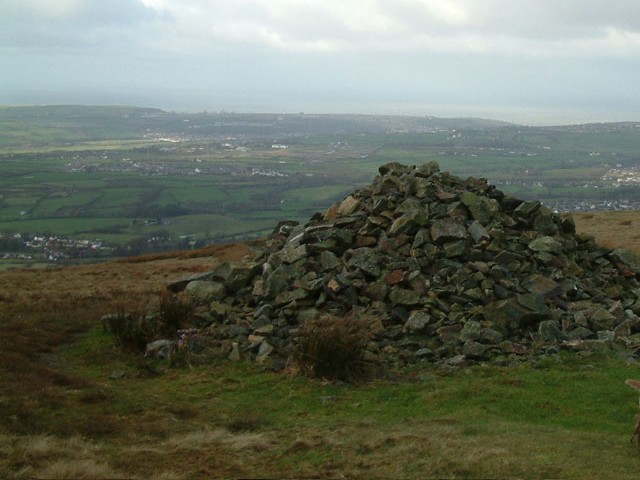
- Cairn on the western slopes of Dent

Highest point
- Elevation: 352 m (1,155 ft)
- Prominence: c. 175 m
- Parent peak: Pillar
- Listing: Marilyn, Outlying Wainwright
- Coordinates: 54°30′08″N 3°28′57″W

Geography
- Location within the Lake District
- Location: Lake District, England
- OS grid: NY041129
- Topo map: OS Landranger 89

Dent is a small fell on the fringe of the English Lake District near the towns of Cleator Moor and Egremont. Sometimes known as Long Barrow, it is traditionally the first fell encountered by hikers following Wainwright's Coast to Coast Walk. It slopes from the westerly point of the Lake District National Park.

At its highest point it stands at only 352 metres (1155 feet), but offers uninterrupted views of the Cumbrian coast from the Ravenglass estuary in the south to the Solway Firth and across to Scotland in the north. In the west the Isle of Man can be easily seen, and views to the east extend to the high peaks of Pillar and the Sca Fells.

‘Dent Hill’ was one of the five stations in Cumberland used by the Ordnance Survey to measure the angles of Principal Triangles for their initial survey of Britain in the years up to and including 1809. The other stations were Black Combe, Scilly Banks (on the outskirts of Whitehaven), High Pike and Cross Fell. The absence of a trig point suggests that Dent was not used in the Retriangulation of Great Britain.

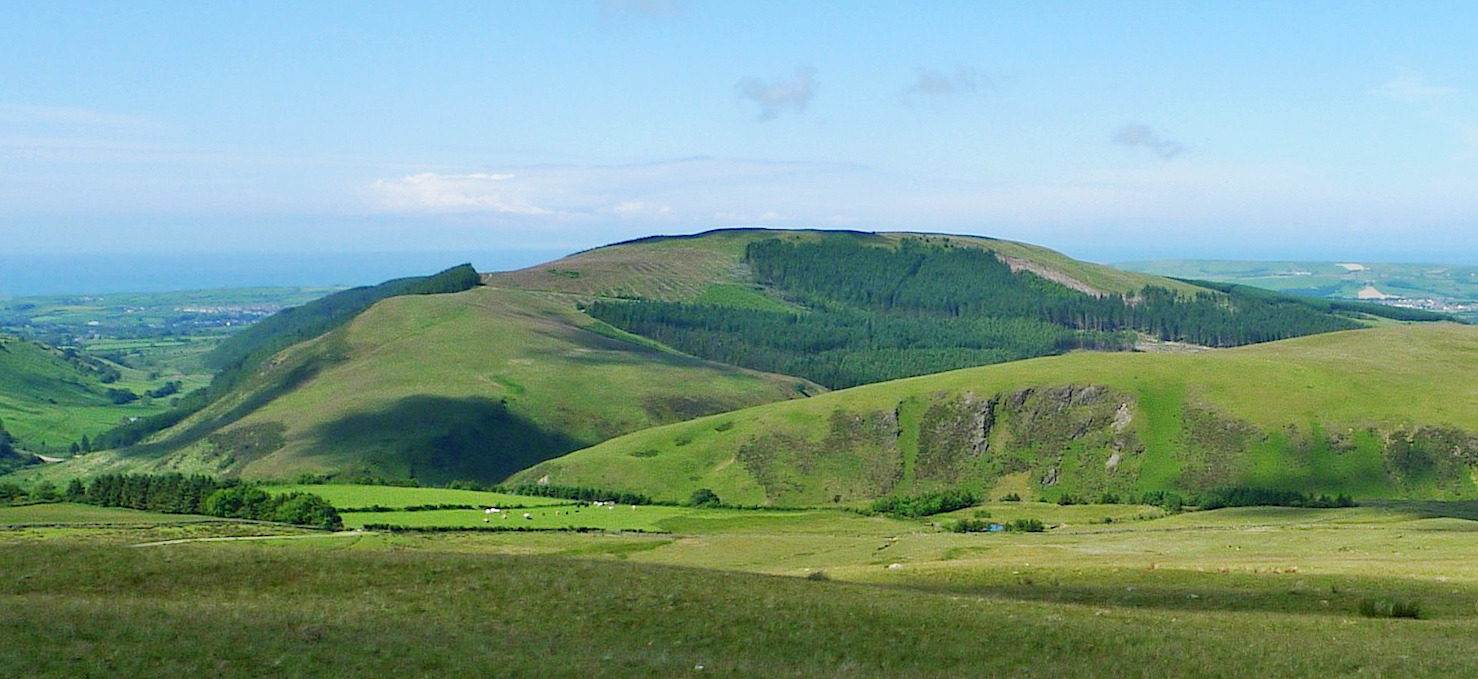
Dent from Blakeley Raise

Over the past 20 years a man-made forest has been planted on the slopes of the fell facing north towards Cleator Moor. This process was carried out to reduce the rate of erosion on the fell. There is already a mature forest on the southern slopes of the fell and public pedestrian access via a gate at Nannycatch.

There is a road at the base of the fell, known locally as ‘the fell road’ (was known as The Roman Road - Fell Road referred to the road from Ennerdale village to Calder Abby. Usage changed over the past 50 years), which runs from Cleator Moor to Egremont. The road is still used by locals, despite its poor quality and that it doesn't represent a shortcut.

The River Ehen also tracks along the base of the fell and the aforementioned road.

Dent, along with Flat Fell, is the subject of a chapter of Wainwright's book The Outlying Fells of Lakeland. His clockwise route to the two summits starts at Wath Brow.
