= Blackening =

Blackening, Blackened, or Blacken may refer to:

== Entertainment ==
- "Blackened", a 1988 Metallica song from ...And Justice for All (album)
- The Blackening, a 2007 album by thrash metal band Machine Head
- The Blackening (film), a 2022 comedy directed by Tim Story

== Places ==
- Blacken (basin), under Lake Mälaren, Sweden

== Other uses ==
- Blackening (chemistry) or black oxide, a conversion coating for ferrous materials
- Blackening (cooking), a cooking technique commonly used in the preparation of fish
- Blackening (Scottish wedding custom), performed in the days or weeks prior to marriages in Scotland

== See also ==
- Blakeney (disambiguation)
- Darkening (disambiguation)
- Dyeing
- Hair colouring
- Shadow
- Shade (colour)
- Shade (shadow)
- Shadowing (disambiguation)
