= Blakley =

Blakley is an English surname. Notable people with the surname include:

- Alan Blakley (1942–1996), English guitarist and record producer
- Brent Blakley, Canadian politician
- Claudie Blakley (born 1974), English actor
- Dwayne Blakley (born 1979), American football player
- George Blakley (1932–2018), American cryptographer and mathematician
- Lin Blakley (born 1947), British actress
- Ronee Blakley (born 1945), American actress and singer
- Sherry Blakley (1962–2011), American racing driver
- William A. Blakley (1898–1976), American politician and businessman

== See also ==
- Blackley, suburb of Manchester
- Blakeley (disambiguation)
- Blakely (disambiguation)
