= Matthew Blakely =

Australian artist

Matthew Blakely is a distinguished and internationally known potter.

He was born in the United Kingdom and emigrated to Australia in 1988 where he studied at the National Art School in Sydney, winning the State Medal in 1993. He moved back to England in 2002 and lives near Cambridge.

Of his work, he says:

I endeavour to make pots that are beautiful visually and physically, and that are a pleasure to use. Function is important to me because it influences the way a pot will be appreciated. I want my pots to be handled, felt and explored as well as being looked at. Often certain qualities present in the pot are quite subtle and will not be discovered easily or quickly. -Matthew Blakely

In an interview with Contemporary Ceramics, Blakely says:

I seem to work in three or four month periods, which is how long it takes me to prepare clays and rocks, make pots, glaze pack and fire my kiln. Clays have to be crushed and prepared. I make my own grogs and have to crush and mill all the rocks for my glazes. This is very time consuming but it’s become extremely important to me that I’m involved in the whole process of making. -Matthew Blakely, 2019
