= Zelma Blakely =

British painter, printmaker and engraver (1921-1978)

Zelma Muriel Blakely
- Born: 26 November 1921; Kensington, London, England
- Died: 6 September 1978 (aged 56); Pin Mill, Suffolk, England
- Education: Kingston School of Art; Slade School of Art
- Known for: Printmaking, book illustration

Zelma Muriel Blakely (26 November 1921 - 6 September 1978) was a British painter, printmaker and engraver who illustrated a number of books.

== Biography ==
Blakely was born in Kensington in London to James Blakely, a British diplomat, and Imeon Maria Matear, who had married in 1920. Blakely attended schools in both the United States and England before studying at Kingston School of Art from 1939 to 1942 and then at the Slade School of Art from 1945 for three years. At the Slade she was taught by both William Coldstream and Randolph Schwabe and won a notable prize, the Wilson Steer Gold Medal. After the Slade, Blakely taught art at Heatherley's School of Art while establishing her career as a printmaker and book illustrator for which her preferred technique was wood-engraving. She was elected an associate member of the Royal Society of Painter-Etchers and Engravers in 1955 and a full member in 1966.

For many years Blakely lived at Rose Cottage at Pin Mill in Suffolk and she was a member of, and regular exhibitor with, the Ipswich Art Club from 1974. Blakely was married twice, first in 1948 to the artist Keith MacKenzie (1924-1983), with who she had three sons, and after their divorce she remarried in 1977.

== Books illustrated ==
- El Zarco the Bandit by Ignacio Manuel Altamirano, (Folio Society, 1957)
- English Fare and French Wines by André Simon (Neame, 1958)
- The Bedside Book of Nature, (Reader's Digest, 1959)
- Geordie's Mermaid by S. Bishop (Methuen Publishing, 1961)
- Treasure Trove (Exploring Poetry) edited by E. W. Parker (Longmans, 1961)
- The Book of the Countryside by A. Phillips and other illustrators (BBC, 1963)
- With Angus in the Forest by M M Reid (Faber and Faber, 1963)
- Under the Sun by J. Varney (Constable, 1964)
- Kippers to Caviar by H. Burke (Evans, 1965)
- The Charterhouse of Parma by Stendhal (Folio Society, 1977)
