= Blakely =

Blakely may refer to:

== People ==
- Blakely (surname)

== Places in the United States ==
- Blakely, Georgia
- Blakely Township, Gage County, Nebraska
- Blakely, Pennsylvania
- Blakely Island, Washington
- Port Blakely, Bainbridge Island, Washington

== Ships ==
- USS Blakely, list

== See also ==
- Blakeley (disambiguation)
