= Thrandeston =

Village in Suffolk, England

Coordinates: 52.346°N 1.104°E

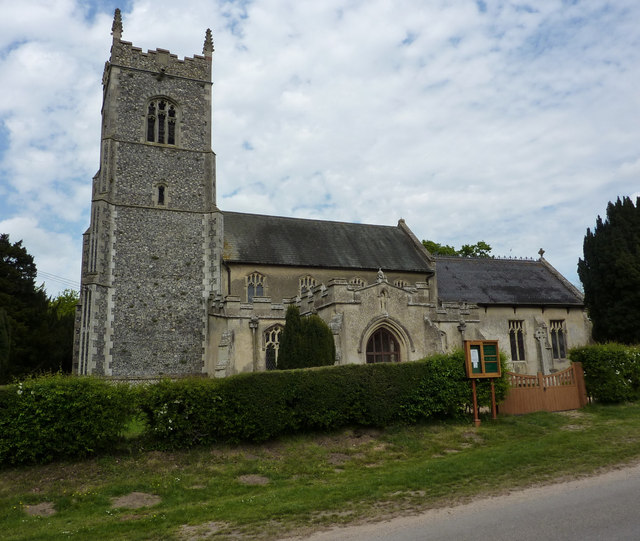
- Church of St Margaret

- Location within Suffolk
- Population: 146 (2011 Census)
- OS grid reference: TM115765
- District: Mid Suffolk
- Shire county: Suffolk
- Region: East
- Country: England
- Sovereign state: United Kingdom
- Post town: DISS
- Postcode district: IP21
- Dialling code: 01379
- Police: Suffolk
- Fire: Suffolk
- Ambulance: East of England
- UK Parliament: Waveney Valley

Thrandeston is a small village on the Norfolk/Suffolk border in England.

== Overview ==
The village is split into two areas, Thrandeston Little Green and Thrandeston Great Green. Most of the housing, the church and rectory are situated in the former and grouped around the triangular green or the three roads leading off it. These lead to Eye, Mellis and Palgrave.

Thrandeston sits on slightly higher ground away from the southern point of the river Waveney that forms the county boundary. The village is situated on the 'High Suffolk' claylands, making it suitable for arable farming.

The village is about a mile away from both the A143 road from Bury St Edmunds to Great Yarmouth and the A140 from Norwich to Ipswich. These were formerly turnpike roads of 1762 and 1711, respectively.

== History ==
Thrandeston had at least 6 holdings listed in the Domesday Book of 1066, the main manor was held by Anselm from the Abbot of St Edmunds and included a church with 8 acres (32,000 m^{2}) of land and woodland for four pigs. There are three moated sites at Malting Farm, Church Farm and Goswold Hall. Goswold Hall has links with the Grey family, the most famous member of which was Lady Jane Grey

Thrandeston has its origins in the arable community mainly in the growing of hemp, as the nearby town of Diss was a large linen market. Three linen weavers, a tailor and a collar maker were all listed in the village in the late 17th century. A cattle fair was held annually on 31 July and in 1848 there were 347 inhabitants.

== Church ==
St Margaret, Thrandeston contains the hatchments of the Blakely family. The 15th-century tower has a dedicatory inscription. It remembers that the Sulyards and the Cornwallises had it built. Inside are medieval carvings and wooden figures and animals, thought to be witches.
