= Thomas Young (writer and theologian) =

English writer and theologian (1772–1835)

The Reverend Thomas Young
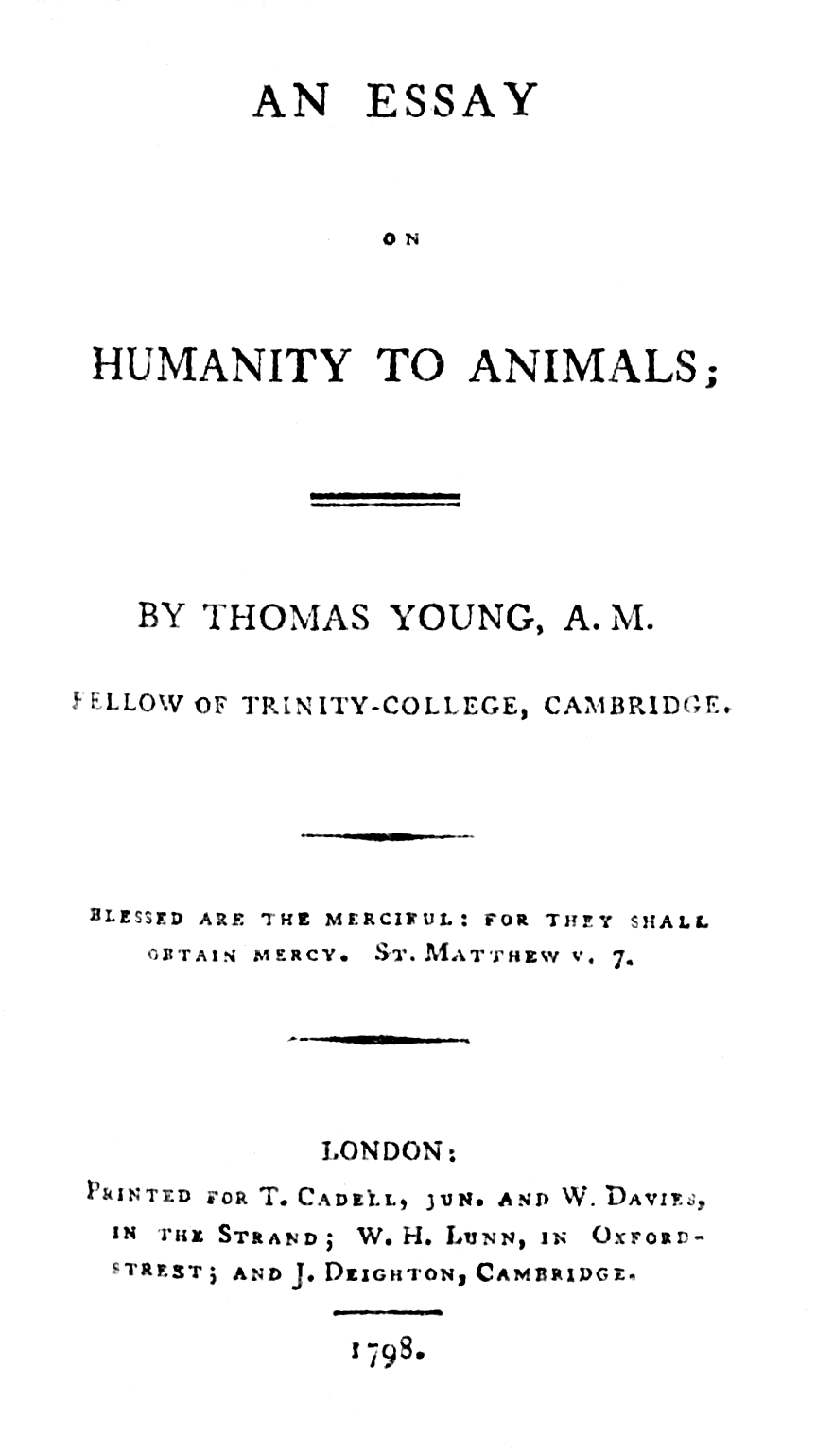
- Title page of An Essay on Humanity to Animals (1798)
- Baptised: 29 December 1772; Dalston, Cumberland, England
- Died: 11 November 1835 (aged 63); Gilling, Yorkshire, England
- Burial place: Holy Cross Church, Gilling
- Education: Hawkshead Grammar School; Trinity College, Cambridge (B.A., 1794; M.A., 1797)
- Occupations: Writer; theologian; educator; clergyman
- Notable work: An Essay on Humanity to Animals (1798)
- Spouse: Mary Simpson Blamire (m. 1814)
- Children: 8
- Relatives: William Blamire (brother-in-law); William Blamire Young (grandson)

Ecclesiastical career
- Religion: Anglicanism
- Offices held: Rector of Gilling (1813–1835)

Thomas Young (1772 – 11 November 1835) was an English Anglican clergyman, theologian, educator, and writer. A fellow of Trinity College, Cambridge, he held several teaching and administrative positions before becoming rector of Gilling, Yorkshire, in 1813, a position he held until his death.

Young is best known for An Essay on Humanity to Animals (1798), in which he argued that animals' capacity to experience pleasure and pain provides a foundation for their rights and for human duties towards them. Drawing on Christian scripture and moral reasoning, he criticised cruelty to animals, particularly hunting, blood sports, and other practices that caused unnecessary suffering. He also published sermons and theological works on Christian doctrine.

== Biography ==
=== Early life and education ===
Thomas Young was born in 1772, the son of Thomas Young of Cumdivock (later of Greensyke) and his wife Rachel Young (née Bewley). He was baptised on 29 December 1772 in Dalston, Cumberland.

Young attended Hawkshead Grammar School, Lancashire, where he was a contemporary of the poet William Wordsworth. He entered Trinity College, Cambridge, in October 1789 as a sizar. He became a scholar in 1793 and graduated with a B.A. in 1794, ranking twelfth in the Mathematical Tripos. He received his M.A. in 1797.

=== Academic and ecclesiastical career ===
Young was elected a fellow of Trinity College in 1795. He was an assistant tutor from 1801 to 1811, a tutor from 1811 to 1813, and senior dean from 1806 to 1809.

He was ordained deacon on 31 May 1801 and priest on 13 June 1802 by George Pretyman (later Tomline), Bishop of Lincoln. In 1813, Young was appointed rector of Gilling, Yorkshire, where he remained until his death in 1835.

From 1809, Young was a subscribing member of the Society for Promoting Christian Knowledge.

=== Personal life and death ===
Young married Mary Simpson Blamire on 15 August 1814. Her brother was William Blamire, MP for Cumberland. The couple had six sons and two daughters. Their grandson was William Blamire Young.

Young died at Gilling on 11 November 1835, aged 63. He was buried at Holy Cross Church, Gilling, where a memorial to him was installed on an interior wall.

== Writings ==
=== An Essay on Humanity to Animals ===
Young published An Essay on Humanity to Animals in 1798 while a fellow of Trinity College, Cambridge. The work combines Christian theology and moral philosophy to argue that humans have duties towards non-human animals. Young examined biblical passages concerning the treatment of animals and argued that scripture establishes divine concern for their welfare.

Young argued that animals are capable of experiencing pleasure and pain and that this capacity provides a basis for recognising their rights. He maintained that the provision made for animals' enjoyment in nature indicates that God intends them to experience happiness, making cruelty contrary to divine will. His argument for the rights of animals therefore drew on both natural morality and Christian teaching.

The book examines forms of cruelty in everyday life and recreation, including hunting, fishing, blood sports, and the treatment of domestic and working animals. Young condemned the infliction of suffering for amusement and argued that kindness towards animals should form part of moral education. He was particularly critical of clergymen who participated in blood sports.

Although Young opposed cruelty inflicted on animals for recreation, he accepted scientific vivisection. His position therefore distinguished between practices he considered unnecessary or cruel and the use of animals in scientific research.

=== Other theological works ===
Young also published sermons on Christian doctrine, including Christ's Resurrection the Cause and Pattern of Ours (1811), Christian Righteousness: A Sermon (1811), Three Sermons on St. Paul's Doctrine (1820), and Seven Sermons on the Lord's Prayer (1827).

== Selected publications ==
- An Essay on Humanity to Animals. London: T. Cadell, jun. and W. Davies. 1798.
- Christ's Resurrection the Cause and Pattern of Ours: A Sermon. Cambridge: J. Smith. 1811.
- Christian Righteousness: A Sermon. Cambridge: J. Smith. 1811.
- Three Sermons on St. Paul's Doctrine. York: J. Wolstenholme. 1820.
- Seven Sermons on the Lord's Prayer. York: J. Wolstenholme. 1827.

== See also ==
- Animal welfare in the United Kingdom
- Christianity and animal rights
- Opposition to hunting
- Christian writers about animal rights and welfare
