= Blakeley Raise =

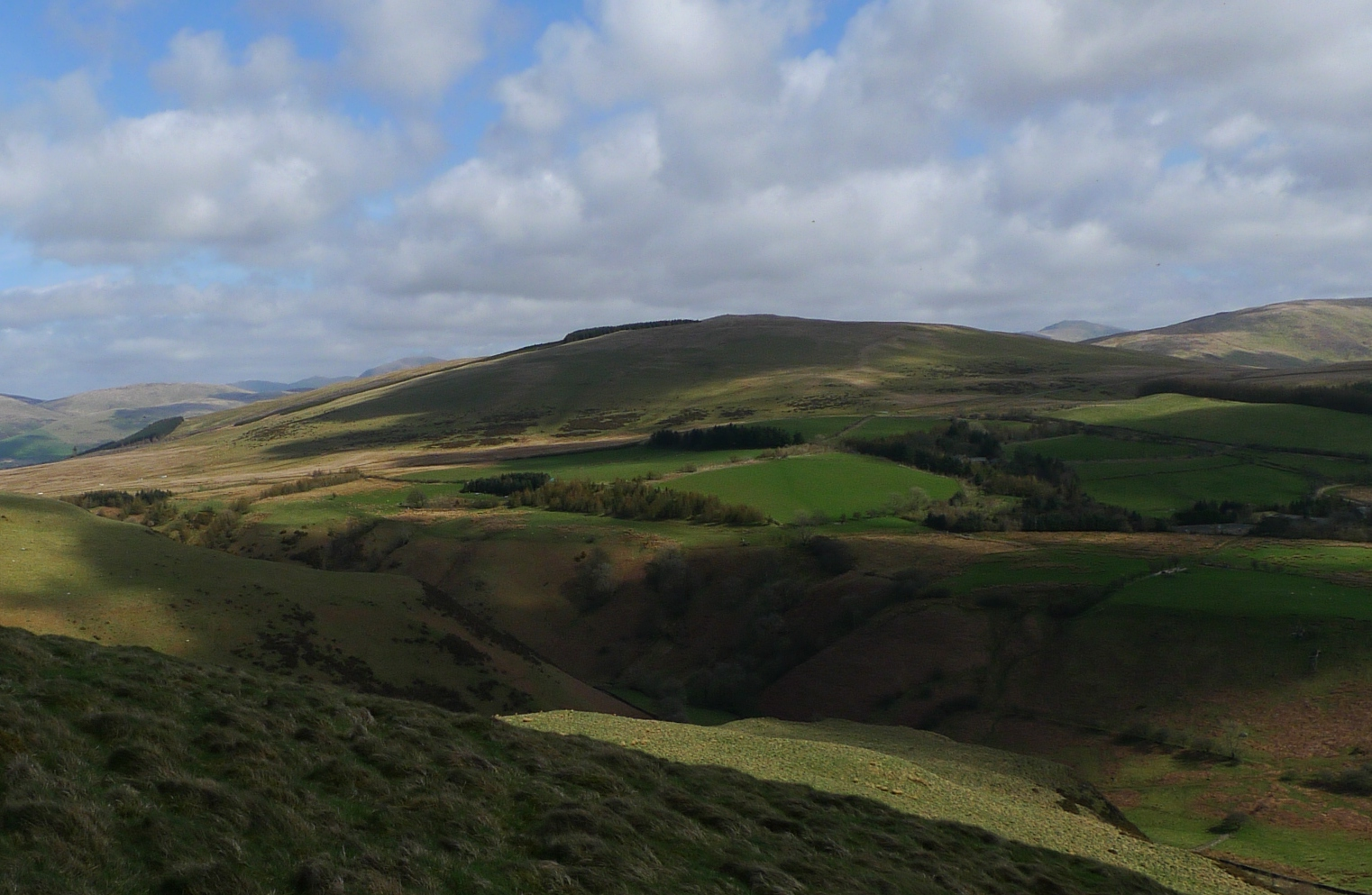
- Blakeley Raise, from Dent

Highest point
- Elevation: 389 m (1,276 ft)
- Parent peak: Crag Fell
- Coordinates: 54°30′36″N 3°27′53″W

Geography
- Location within the Lake District
- Location: Lake District, England
- Topo map: OS Landranger 89, 90, Explorer OL4

Blakeley Raise is a fell in the English Lake District, standing at 389m. Unlike its neighbours Grike, Crag Fell and Lank Rigg it is not listed as a Wainwright. Despite this lack of status, Blakeley Raise is a worthy climb, providing extensive views over West Cumbria, Southern Scotland and the Isle of Man, including the towns of Whitehaven and Cleator Moor and the Sellafield nuclear processing site.

== Topography ==
Blakeley Raise is a gentle, dome shaped hill, joined to the North-East to Heckbarley (a subsidiary summit of Grike). The lower Western slopes of Blakeley include an area of wetland known as Blakeley Moss, and the Kinniside Stone Circle. The Northern slopes are heavily forested. A harvesting operation cleared part of this woodland in the mid-nineties, which has subsequently been replanted. A further phase of harvesting has recently been completed, near the summit of Blakeley. The remainder of the hill is covered by rough grassland, grazed by horse and sheep.
