= Blackening (Scottish wedding custom) =

Blackening is a traditional wedding custom performed in the days or weeks prior to marriages in rural areas of Scotland and Northern Ireland.

The bride and/or groom are "captured" by friends and family, covered in food, or a variety of other – preferably adhesive – substances, then paraded publicly for the community to see. Frequently, the couple are driven in the back of an open-backed truck, accompanied by the clattering and banging of pots and pans by the couple's "captors". There are no strict rules regarding the act of blackening itself, only that the couple must be rendered messy and uncomfortable, and that as many people as possible should witness the occasion.

Blackenings occur predominantly in rural areas of north-east Scotland, the Highlands and the Northern Isles. The origins of the custom are obscure; however researcher, Dr. Sheila Young of the Elphinstone Institute, University of Aberdeen has shown that it evolved from an earlier Scottish ritual called the feet-washing. There is uncertainty surrounding just when it began, but it probably started as a solemn washing ritual for both men and women on the eve of their wedding and included a blackening of the feet and legs by the early 19th century.

A little later, it had developed into a kind of a game, with the legs and feet being alternately blackened and scrubbed clean, and then by the end of the 19th century early 20th century escape, capture and pillorying had become part of the ritual. In order for this to happen, the ritual had to move out of doors. The move out of doors appears to have coincided with a change in wedding practices, with more people marrying in the summer.

A ritual, which began as a washing ceremony, developed into a dirtying ceremony. It is probable then, that a change in the form of the ritual led to a change in name. The blackening's roots are Scottish, though a similar practice, called a "doing", is to be found in Northern Ireland.
