= William Blakeley =

English actor (1830–1897)

William Blakeley (c. 1830 – 8 December 1897) was an English actor.

== Biography ==
William Blakeley played as an amateur at the Gough Street theatre, now pulled down, and at the Soho theatre, now the Royalty.

Blakely’s first appearance as a salaried actor was at the Theatre Royal, Dublin, with Sir William Don. He then played Polonius and other parts at the Amphitheatre, Liverpool, and accompanied Sothern on tour, playing Asa Trenchard to his Lord Dundreary in 'Our American Cousin.' In London he was seen for the first time on 21 December 1807 at the Prince of Wales's theatre, Tottenham Street, as Sir Abel Hotspur in Boucicault's 'How she loves him,' a part he had taken at the first production at the Prince of Wales's theatre, Liverpool, on 7 December 1863. On 15 February 1868, he was the first Bodmin Todder in 'Play,' and was John Chodd senior in a revival of 'Society.' Mr. Tweedie in Yates's 'Tame Cats' followed on 12 December.

At the Olympic he was, on 1 May 1871, Simeon Cole in Byron's 'Daisy Farm.' After, in 1880, accompanying Sothern to America, he appeared at the Criterion on 23 July 1881 as Jeremiah Deeds in 'Flats in Four Stories' ('Les Locataires de Monsieur Blondeau'), adapted by Mr. G. R. Sims. With this theatre his name is principally associated. Here he played Babblebrook in 'A Lesson in Love,' and very many comic parts in revivals of 'Brighton,' 'Betsy,' 'Pink Dominos,' and 'Still Waters run deep.' Among his original characters at the Criterion were Talbot in Mr. Gilbert's 'Foggerty's Fairy,' 15 December 1881; Brummies in H. J. Byron's 'Fourteen Days,' 4 March 1882; Ferdinand Pettigrew in Albery's 'Featherbrain,' 23 June 1884; Barnabas Goodeve in the 'Candidate,' 29 November; General Bletchingley in Mr. Burnand's 'Headless Man,' 27 July 1890. At Daly's theatre he was, 2 February 1895, Smoggins in 'An Artist's Model;' Duckworth Crabbe in the 'Chili Widow,' Mr. Arthur Bourchier's adaptation of 'M. le Directeur,' 7 September; and Commodore Van Gütt in the 'New Baby,' 28 April 1896. His last appearance in London was at the Criterion as Thomas Tyndal in 'Four Little Girls,' by Mr. Walter Stokes Craven, produced 17 July 1897.

Besides being what is known as a 'mugger,' or maker of comic faces, Blakeley was a genuine comedian, and was accepted as Hardcastle in 'She Stoops to Conquer.' In showing self-importance, in airs of assumed dignity, and in the revelation of scandalised propriety, he stood alone. He died at Criterion House, Clovelly Terrace, Walham, London, on 8 December 1897 and was buried in Fulham cemetery.
