= Paul Blakeley =

English cricketer (born 1964)

Personal information
- Full name: Paul Malcolm Blakeley
- Born: 24 May 1964 (age 62); Dewsbury, Yorkshire, England
- Batting: Right-handed
- Bowling: Right-arm medium

Domestic team information
- Years: Team
- 1993–1994: Shropshire

Career statistics
Competition	List A
Matches	1
Runs scored	23
Batting average	23.00
100s/50s	–/–
Top score	23
Balls bowled	48
Wickets	–
Bowling average	–
5 wickets in innings	–
10 wickets in match	–
Best bowling	–
Catches/stumpings	–/–
- Source: Cricinfo, 2 July 2011

Paul Malcolm Blakeley (born 27 May 1964) is a former English cricketer. Blakeley was a right-handed batsman who bowled right-arm medium pace. He was born in Dewsbury, Yorkshire.

Blakeley made his debut for Shropshire in the 1993 Minor Counties Championship against Berkshire. Blakeley played Minor counties cricket for Shropshire from 1993 to 1994, which included 14 Minor Counties Championship appearances and 2 MCCA Knockout Trophy matches. He made his only List A appearance against Somerset in the 1993 NatWest Trophy. In this match, he bowled 8 wicket-less overs for the cost of 69 runs, while with the bat he scored 23 runs before being dismissed by Mushtaq Ahmed.
