= Guillaume-Hyacinthe Bougeant =

French Jesuit and writer (1690–1743)

Guillaume-Hyacinthe Bougeant, known as le Père Bougeant (4 November 1690, Quimper, Brittany – 17 January 1743, Paris) was a French Jesuit and historian.

== Life ==
Bougeant entered the Society of Jesus in 1706, taught classics in the College of Caen and Nevers and lived for a number of years in Paris until his death. His Amusement philosophique sur le language des bêtes (Philosophical Amusements on the Language of the Animals), published in 1737, attracted the censure of his superiors, leading to his brief exile from Paris. It was translated into English, Italian, and German.

== Works ==
His historical works on the Thirty Years' War and on the Treaty of Westphalia have been regarded as among the best historical books written by Jesuits. They were translated into German. He is also the author of a theological treatise on the form of consecration of the Eucharist, and of a Catechism divided into three parts, historical, dogmatic, and practical. This catechism, translated into Italian and German, went through many editions and was still in use in 1900. In his three comedies, Le Femme Docteur, Le Saint déniché, and Les Quakres français he satirizes the Jansenists. The first of the three went through twenty-five editions in a few months, and was translated into Italian, Polish, Spanish, and Dutch. Between 1725 and 1737 he contributed many articles to the Mémoires de Trévoux.
