= St Mary's Church, Wath =

Church in Wath, North Yorkshire, England

Coordinates: 54°11′21″N 1°30′12″W

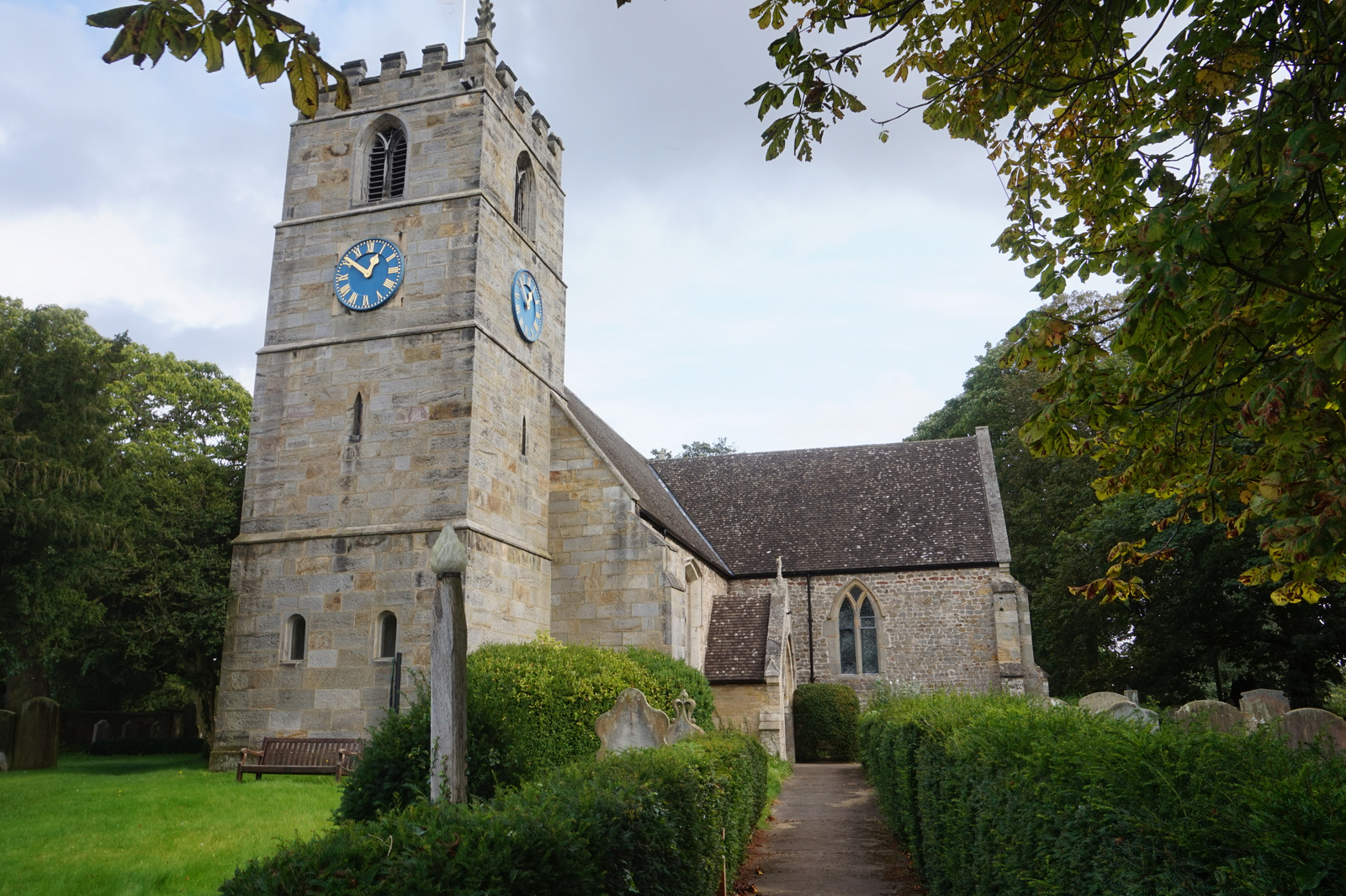
The church, in 2020

St Mary's Church is the parish church of Wath, a village near Ripon in North Yorkshire, in England.

The church was built in the 13th century and a vestry was added in the 15th century. The roofs were lowered and the chancel and transept arches removed in 1629, then a tower was added in 1812. The church was restored in 1873, and the roofs were replaced in the 20th century. The building was grade II* listed in 1955. In 2026, a new stone and glass porch was added to improve accessibility and heat retention.

The church is built of stone with cobbles, and consists of a nave, a south transept, a chancel with a north vestry and organ chamber, and a west tower. The tower has five stages, string courses, clock faces, two-light bell openings, and an embattled parapet with corner finials. Fragments of Saxon crosses are embedded in the north wall of the organ chamber. In the south transept, there is a 13th-century piscina, 15th-century brass monuments, and a tomb recess. The chancel has a double piscina, three sedilia, and a 14th-century wooden chest.

== See also ==
- Grade II* listed churches in North Yorkshire (district)
- Listed buildings in Wath (near Ripon)
