= Kinniside Stone Circle =

Archaeological site in Cumbria, England

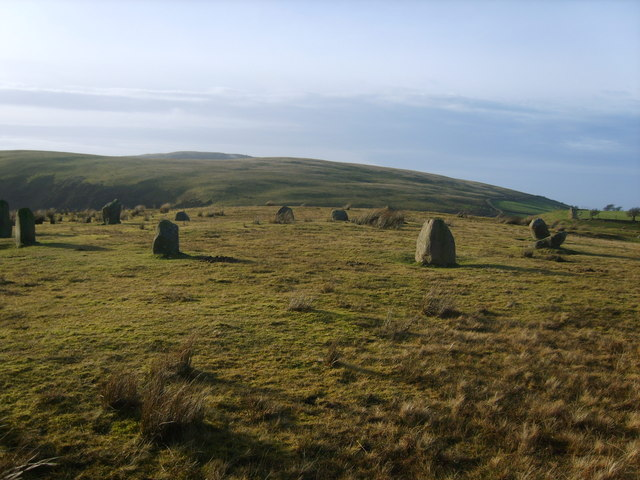
- Kinniside Stone Circle

- Location within Cumbria
- 54.513013°N 3.452687°W
- Type: Stone circle
- Periods: Neolithic? / Bronze Age?
- Location: Cumbria

Kinniside Stone Circle (or Blakeley Raise Stone Circle) is a reconstructed stone circle in the civil parish of Ennerdale and Kinniside in Cumbria, England (grid reference NY060140).

== Description ==
Kinniside Stone Circle is situated next to the fell road from Ennerdale Bridge to Calder Bridge in Cumbria. It consists of 11 small stones of local granite with a possible cairn at its centre.

The circle was apparently dismantled in the 18th century by a farmer who used the stones for gate-posts. In 1925 a Doctor Quine of Frizington "restored" the stone circle, setting the stones in concrete. Whether or not he erected the stones in their original stone holes is unclear, and it is unlikely that all of the re-erected stones come from the original circle.
