= Wath (near Ripon) =

Village and civil parish in North Yorkshire, England

Coordinates: 54°11′18″N 1°30′20″W

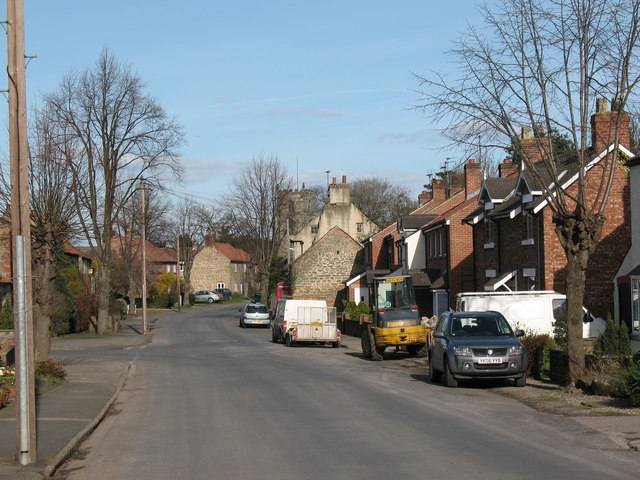
- Wath

- Location within North Yorkshire
- Population: 210 (2015)
- OS grid reference: SE324770
- Civil parish: Wath
- Unitary authority: North Yorkshire
- Ceremonial county: North Yorkshire
- Region: Yorkshire and the Humber
- Country: England
- Sovereign state: United Kingdom
- Post town: RIPON
- Postcode district: HG4
- Police: North Yorkshire
- Fire: North Yorkshire
- Ambulance: Yorkshire

Wath (alias Wath-by-Ripon) is a village and civil parish 3.7 miles (6 km) north of Ripon in North Yorkshire, England. The population of the parish was estimated at 210 in 2015.

St Mary's Church, Wath is the Anglican parish church.

== History ==
The name Wath derives from Old Norse and means "ford", which has led to speculation that the name associates with a crossing through water, most likely Wath Beck at the east end of the village. The village is noted in the Domesday Book of 1086, where it was in the ownership of Count Alan, having previously been owned by Archil and Rothschil in 1066. William the Conqueror granted to Count Alan.

The manor and village were in dispute about ownership through the first half of the 13th century. These disputes culminated in a Papal Court which decided that the two warring parties would submit a champion each in a duel. The abbot of Mont St Michel feared for his life, and that of his champion, and so renounced all claims on the village. The winner was Sir Robert Marmion, whose family were already resident at West Tanfield and who built their castle (Marmion Tower).

Wath was historically a large ancient parish in the North Riding of Yorkshire, which also included the townships of Melmerby, Middleton Quernhow and Norton Conyers. Wath and the other townships became separate civil parishes in 1866.

== Governance ==
Wath is part of the electoral ward of Wathvale. This ward stretches south to Norton-le-Clay with a total population taken at the 2011 Census of 3,479.

From 1974 to 2023 it was part of the Borough of Harrogate, it is now administered by the unitary North Yorkshire Council.

== See also ==
- Listed buildings in Wath (near Ripon)
