= Graduate Theological Foundation =

American interreligious theological education foundation

- Established: 1962; 64 years ago
- President: Paul Kirbas
- Address: 3288 S Tamiami Trail, Suite 294
- Location: Sarasota, Florida, United States
- Website: gtfeducation.org

The Graduate Theological Foundation (GTF) is an American nonprofit interreligious institution of higher learning, originally founded in Indiana but now centered in Sarasota, Florida. The foundation focuses on providing educational opportunities for practicing ministry professionals, administrators, and academics who want to pursue advanced degrees while retaining their current position. Students and faculty reside around the world, and scholarly work takes place through onsite, and distance learning engagement. Students are eligible to earn bachelors, masters, and doctoral degrees in a variety of theological disciplines. Faculty members come from a broad spectrum of faith backgrounds, and many also serve on the faculty of established colleges and universities, including the University of Oxford, with which the foundation has an affiliation through the Oxford Theology Summer School at Christ Church College.

== History ==
The Graduate Theological Foundation was founded in 1962. The Conference on Religious Development was originally commissioned to foster growing ecumenical relationships between Catholic and Protestant communions. The foundation emerged from a variety of residential programs held by the conference in Madison, Connecticut.

At first the foundation was formed as a traditional continuing education center for clergy, with a retreat model incorporating individuals or small groups working with creative curriculum, full on-site student residency and a dedicated faculty. At the urging of students and faculty for more flexible educational opportunities, the foundation created a new program requiring only part-time residency.

Over the years the foundation has evolved into a self-directed education model designed to be responsive to the 21st-century needs of ministry professionals across the globe. Students and faculty engage through online, distance and onsite learning methods. The foundation has scholarly partnerships with academic institutions around the world where graduate degree students may complete their course work.

The foundation is incorporated in the state of Indiana and is authorized to award advanced degrees in various fields of Theological study. The foundation is an independent non-profit body with tax-exempt status on both the state (Indiana) and federal levels.

== Academics ==
The Graduate Theological Foundation's education model is designed for working ministry professionals, academics and administrators to earn advanced degrees while retaining their current position. Faculty and students engage through online, on-site and distance learning engagements. The foundation also enters in partnerships with traditional universities both in the U.S. and internationally where students may complete academic requirements toward their degree. Students have a large degree of flexibility in helping to design their curriculum in conjunction with faculty, and in determining their own time frame for earning degrees.

Graduate degrees are divided into professional and academic degrees. Professional degrees are practice-oriented in the relevant field of study with an emphasis on topical issues and solutions to identifiable challenges. Final projects are evaluated by faculty before a degree is awarded, with no oral defense required. Academic degrees are geared toward research and require a master's or doctoral thesis before a degree is awarded. An oral defense of the thesis is required for doctoral degrees.

Bachelor's degrees can also be earned through a degree completion program for students in pastoral positions and are available in three areas; theological studies, religious education and sacred music.

== Faculty ==
Faculty members number approximately 80 and come from a wide array of faith backgrounds and areas of specialization. A majority of faculty also hold positions at other universities or institutions.

Foundation professorships fall into two categories: visiting faculty, which indicates temporary association through special arrangement, and named professorships, reflecting permanent members of the faculty who make up the bulk of the teaching staff.

Since most faculty members reside offsite, professors and students engage through a variety of distance, online and onsite learning. Faculty are required to evaluate the written coursework of students, evaluate their degree projects and research theses, act as doctoral thesis supervisors and offer tutorials.

Notable faculty members include:

- The Revd Paul J. Kirbas, the Paul Tillich Professor of Theology and Culture. President and CEO of the Graduate Theological Foundation.
- The Revd Andrew Linzey, Bergh Professor of Animal Ethics; Director of the Oxford Centre for Animal Ethics. Has been a member of the Faculty of Theology in the University of Oxford for 28 years.
- Clair Linzey, Frances Power Cobbe Professor of Animal Theology.
- The Revd Canon Robin Gibbons, Fellow and Alexander Schemann Professor of Eastern Christianity; also a Faculty of Theology member at the University of Oxford and Director of Studies for Theology and Religion, Oxford University Department for Continuing Education.
- The Revd Jane Shaw, Fellow and the Evelyn Underhill Professor of Historical Theology; former dean of Grace Episcopal Cathedral in San Francisco; Principal of Harris Manchester College, University of Oxford.
- Rabbi Norman Solomon, Professor of Judaica; also faculty member of Wolfson College, Oxford University and former director of the Centre for the Study of Judaism and Jewish Christian Relations at Selly Oak College.
- The Revd Hugh R. Page, Benjamin E. Mays Professor of Scripture and Applied Ministries; also Associate Professor of Theology and Dean of First Year of Studies at the University of Notre Dame.
- The Revd James F. Puglisi, SA, Fellow and Francis Joseph Cardinal Spellman Professor of Catholic Theology; also director of ecumenical research and minister general of the Franciscan Friars of Atonement at the Centro Pro Unione.
- The Revd Fr Jorge R Colón León, Fellow and François-Xavier Durrwell, C.Ss.R., Professor of Religious Studies.
- Ann V Graber, Fellow and Professor of Pastoral Logotherapy and Diplomate of the Viktor Frankl Institute of Logotherapy.
- Maria (Ómoroviczai Ungár) Marshall, PhD (University of Alberta, Canada), Mignon G. Eisenberg Professor of Logotherapy, Diplomate Clinician, Lifetime Member, and Faculty of the Viktor Frankl Institute of Logotherapy.
- Edward (Méndez Asín) Marshall, MD, PhD, Dipl. Psych. (University of Leeds, UK). Viktor E. Frankl Professor of Psychotherapy and Spirituality. Diplomate Clinician, Lifetime Member, and Faculty of the Viktor Frankl Institute of Logotherapy. Fellow Scholas Chairs, University of Meaning, Vatican City.
- The Revd Msgr Charles Chaffman, Professor of Theological and Tribunal Studies; also serves as a judicial vicar and Director of the International Institute of Theological and Tribunal Studies in the Archdiocese of Los Angeles.
- Omar Ahmed Shahin, Professor of Islamic Law and Director Islamic Studies.
- The Revd Canon Vincent Strudwick, Fellow and Bishop John Tinsley Professor of Anglican Theology; recipient of the Lambeth degree of Doctor of Divinity conferred by the Archbishop of Canterbury.

Notable emeriti faulty members:

- The Very Revd John Moses KCVO, John Macquarrie Professor of Anglican Theology and former Dean of St. Paul's Cathedral, London.
- John Henry Morgan, Karl Mannheim Professor of the History and Philosophy of Social Sciences and former president of the Graduate Theological Foundation
- The Revd Robley Edward Whitson, Fellow and Distinguished Professor of Theological Anthropology. First President of the Graduate Thological Foundation.

== Student makeup ==
Graduate Theological Foundation students come from a large geographical spectrum, including all 50 U.S. states and 64 countries. Students also come from a wide range of faith backgrounds.

== Publications and collections ==
Direct publications of the Graduate Theological Foundation reflect its student body of working ministry professionals engaged in pastoral, educational, health-related or counseling vocation.

The Oxford Theology Monograph is a gathering of essays written by faculty members related to course work at the University of Oxford Theology Summer School, a partnership between the Foundation and the University Oxford that has existed since 1994.

Foundation Theology is an annual collection of essays written by students and faculty of the Foundation deemed worthy of special consideration and publication.

There are several notable collections of books, personal papers and other media of interest to theological researchers housed at the Macquarrie Library. This includes the Macquarrie Project, a multimedia collection relating to Christian theologian Canon John Macquarrie, that includes his personal research library, audio recordings of Macquarrie's lectures, library notations and a tome of sermons.

== Accreditation ==
The Graduate Theological Foundation does not hold accreditation through either the United States Department of Education (USDE) or the Council for Higher Education Accreditation (CHEA). As an educational foundation, GTF is incorporated by the state of Indiana and is chartered by the state to award advanced degrees in various fields of theological study.

== Affiliations and summer programs ==
The foundation also holds affiliations with members of P.R.I.M.E. (Partnering Resources in Ministry Education), a network of 16 institutions of higher learning where students taking courses at P.R.I.M.E. affiliate institutions may earn credit toward their GTF degree.

The Graduate Theological Foundation maintains affiliation with the University of Oxford. This partnership, established in 1994, allows foundation students to earn credit toward their degree at the annual Oxford Theology Summer School hosted at Christ Church College.

The foundation has a similar affiliation with the Centro Pro Unione in Rome, Italy, allowing students to study at the Summer School offered at the Centro Pro Unione in the west wing of the Palazzo Pamphilj (Former Collegio Innocenziano) in Piazza Navona, Rome.
