= St John Street area =

Area of Oxford, England

Coordinates: 51.756°N 1.262°W

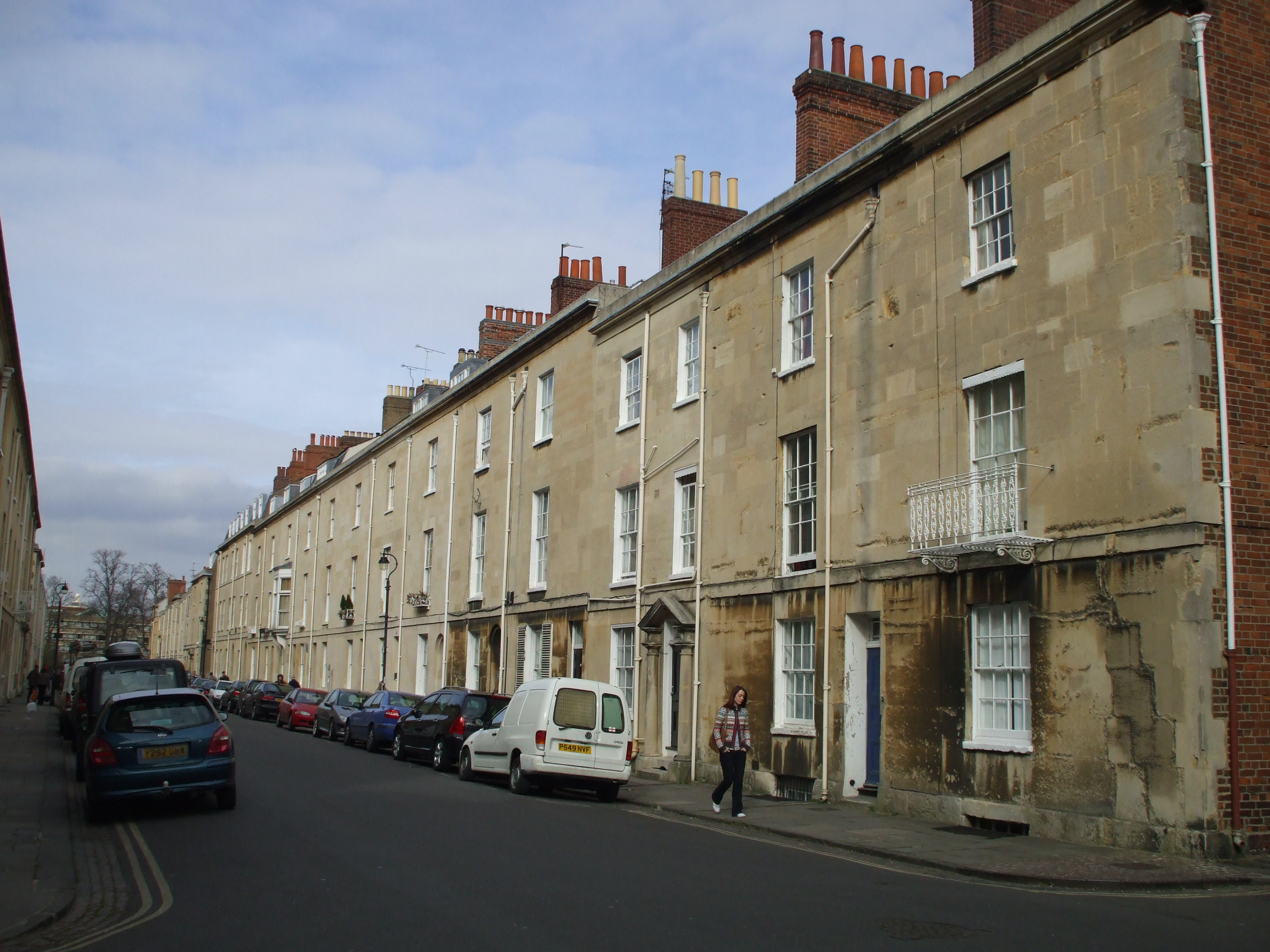
- Looking north along St John Street

- Location within Oxfordshire
- OS grid reference: SP510065
- Civil parish: unparished
- District: Oxford
- Shire county: Oxfordshire
- Region: South East
- Country: England
- Sovereign state: United Kingdom
- Post town: Oxford
- Postcode district: OX1
- Dialling code: 01865
- Police: Thames Valley
- Fire: Oxfordshire
- Ambulance: South Central
- UK Parliament: Oxford West and Abingdon
- Website: Oxford City Council

The St John Street area is a residential area close to the city centre in Oxford, England. It consists of two streets, St John Street and Beaumont Buildings. Wellington Square is to the north, Pusey Street to the east, and Beaumont Street to the south.

It is an area of terraced houses developed in about 1830 as part of the same scheme as Beaumont Street.

== Sources and further reading ==
- Chance, Eleanor; Colvin, Christina; Cooper, Janet; Day, C.J.; Hassall, T.G.; Selwyn, Nesta (1979). Crossley, Alan; Elrington, C.R. (eds.). Victoria County History: A History of the County of Oxford, Volume 4.
- Sherwood, Jennifer; Pevsner, Nikolaus (1974). The Buildings of England: Oxfordshire. Harmondsworth: Penguin Books. p. 324. ISBN 0-14-071045-0.
- Tyack, Geoffrey (1998). Oxford An Architectural Guide. Oxford & New York: Oxford University Press. p. 204. ISBN 0-19-817423-3.
