= SSBR =

SSBR can refer to:

- Society for the Study of Black Religion, an American academic society
- Solution styrene-butadiene rubber, a form of synthetic rubber
- Super Smash Bros. Brawl, a video game for the Nintendo Wii
