= Kellogg College, Oxford =

College of the University of Oxford

Kellogg College
- University of Oxford
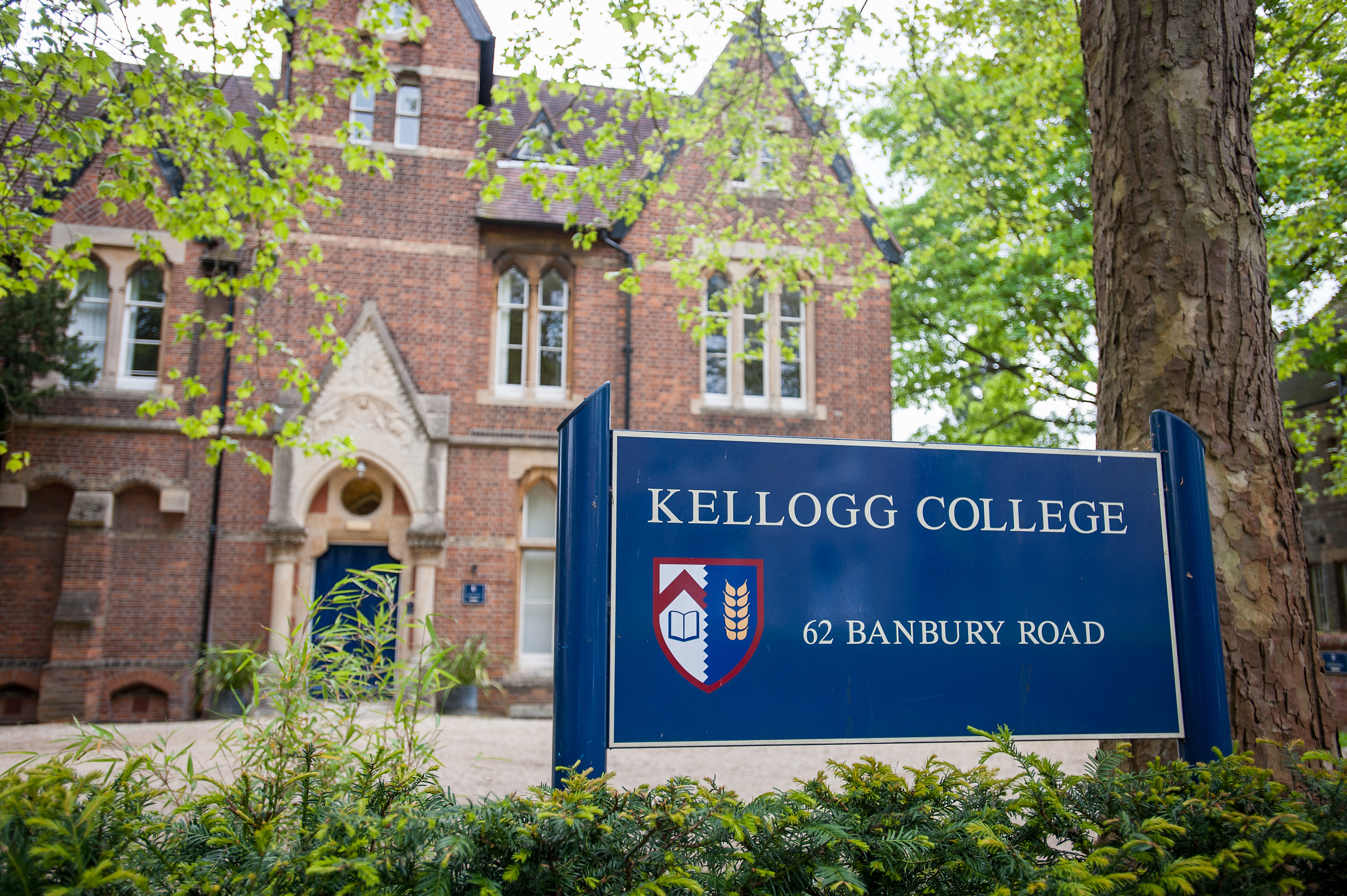
- Kellogg College exterior

- Arms: Per pale indented argent and azure on the argent a chevron enhanced gules in base a book azure leaved argent on the azure an ear of wheat palewise or the whole within a bordure gules.
- Location: Banbury Road and Bradmore Road
- Coordinates: 51.764°N 1.260°W
- Latin name: Collegium de Kellogg
- Established: 1990
- Named for: Will Keith Kellogg
- Sister college: None
- President: Jonathan Michie
- Undergraduates: None
- Postgraduates: 1139 (total students, Dec 2017)
- Website: www.kellogg.ox.ac.uk
- Boat club: Christ Church Boat Club

Map
- Location within Oxford city centre

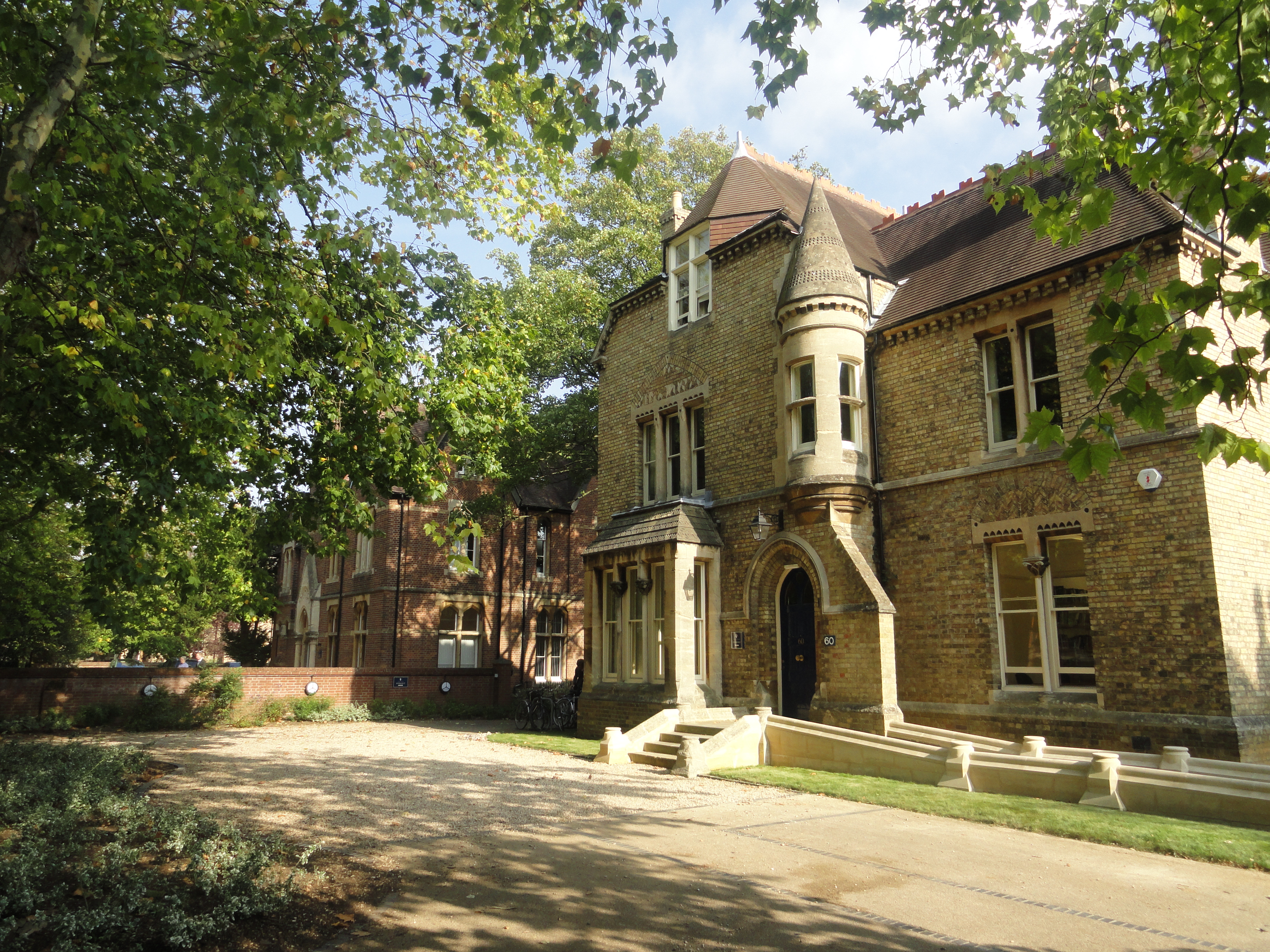
60 Banbury Road, Kellogg College's main entrance

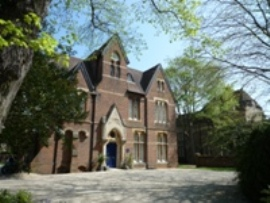
62 Banbury Road building

Kellogg College is a constituent college of the University of Oxford in England. Founded in 1990 as Rewley House, Kellogg is the university's 36th college and the largest by number of students both full and part-time. Named after the Kellogg Foundation, as benefactor, the college hosts research centres including the Institute of Population Ageing and the Centre for Creative Writing. It is closely identified with lifelong learning at Oxford.

Kellogg is lodged in a group of formal Victorian era buildings in residential Norham Manor. As with most of the university's graduate colleges, the college has an egalitarian spirit which is reflected by a lack of formal separation between fellows and students. The college has no high table and, uniquely among Oxford's colleges, its grace is in Welsh (in commemoration of its official founding on St. David's Day). It is also unique in having its own tartan.

The president of the college is Jonathan Michie who is Professor of Innovation & Knowledge Exchange. Michie succeeded the founder of the college, Geoffrey Thomas, as president.

== History ==
Kellogg College was the first home for part-time students at the University of Oxford and a number of the students who join the college continue to work in their professions while they study. The college continues to promote ideals of access, openness, and inclusivity. As of Michaelmas Term 2017 the student body numbers 1139 students, of whom 268 are attending full-time and 871 part-time. The college has accepted both women and men as students since its foundation.

The college came into being on 1 March 1990 (as Rewley House) and was renamed in honour of Will Keith Kellogg on 1 October 1994, in recognition of the financial support given by the W. K. Kellogg Foundation to the university over the preceding decade. The college has close connections with the university's departments for continuing education, medicine, education, computer science, and law, and other departments active in areas of professional and part-time study. Until 2021, the Director of the Department for Continuing Education was ex officio President of Kellogg College.

The college can trace its origins back to the start of the university extension movement in the 1870s. In 1878, Arthur Johnson was the first to deliver an "Oxford Extension Lecture". The movement grew out of a drive to liberalise Oxford which gained momentum in the 1850s. As a consequence, the university slowly began to open itself to religious nonconformists, poorer men, and women. It is this movement that forms the historical background of Kellogg. The Oxford Extension movement is sometimes credited with taking "Oxford to the masses". Lectures were given in town halls, public libraries and village school rooms across the country. The aim of the extension movement was twofold: social and political. It aimed at educating the larger community to achieve a better informed democracy.

Kellogg College celebrated its "coming of age" in 2011 and celebrated its 25th anniversary in March 2015.

In November 2019 Charles, Prince of Wales was announced as Honorary Fellow to celebrate Kellogg's 30th anniversary in 2020. He visited the college in March 2020 to receive his award.

== Buildings ==
Until 2009 the college shared Rewley House in Wellington Square with the Department for Continuing Education. In May 2004, the college acquired a site for a new permanent home, located between Banbury Road and Bradmore Road, in the Norham Manor area of North Oxford, a 10-minute walk from Wellington Square. The existing Victorian buildings have been renovated to provide a dining hall, residential accommodation, offices, study facilities, and research space. The college offices moved to the Banbury Road site in April 2006.

=== The Hub ===
The Hub opened on 2 May 2017 and was shortlisted for an RIBA (Royal Institute of British Architects) South Regional Award. It is the first Passivhaus-certified project at the University of Oxford. The Hub Café is cashless, requiring all payments to be made by card.

=== Geoffrey Thomas House ===
Geoffrey Thomas House is located at 60 Banbury Road and is named after the first college president Geoffrey Thomas. The building was designed by William Wilkinson and constructed in 1865–1866. A rear extension was constructed in 1902.

Geoffrey Thomas House houses the college library on the ground and first floor. Facilities include six reading-rooms, all with wireless connectivity and three with power points for the desk-based use of laptops, and a computer room with printing/copying facilities.

=== Seminar rooms ===
The Mawby Room is located between 60 and 62 Banbury Road, and was named after Russell Mawby. It is located to the immediate left of the main reception area, and provides movable furniture, a lectern and a projector.

=== Accommodation ===
Kellogg College provides accommodation for both full-time and part-time students. In addition to accommodation owned by the college, the college is also able to offer university-owned accommodation.

== Administration ==
Together with Reuben and St Cross, Kellogg is one of only three Oxford colleges without a royal charter. It is officially a society of the university rather than an independent college. The main difference from an independent college is that the Director of the Department for Continuing Education is ex officio President; in other colleges, the head of house is elected and appointed by the governing body directly. For accounting purposes, the societies are considered departments of the university.

== Sport ==
Kellogg maintains a strong presence: former Heineken Cup winner Dom Waldouck was elected as the university's Rugby Captain for 2018 while Johanna Dombrowski was a recent President of Oxford University RFC women's team.

=== Rowing ===
Kellogg students row for Christ Church Boat Club in college competitions and also row in the university Boat Races against Cambridge. In 2013, Kellogg students rowed in the victorious men's, women's, women's lightweight and reserve boats. Later in 2016, alumnus Paul Bennett won a gold medal for Great Britain in the Rio Olympics as did current student Grace Clough in the Paralympics.

=== Gym ===
Whilst Kellogg College does not have its own dedicated gym, members of the college are provided with free access to the University Sports Centre on Iffley Road. Additionally, as Kellogg College is a postgraduate-only college, all of its members are eligible to join The Oxford University Club free of charge. For an additional fee, members may utilise the onsite gym.

=== Punting ===
Kellogg College has its own punt, currently moored at the Cherwell Boathouse on Bardwell Road. The punt is free to use by members of the college, but must be booked in advance.

=== Cricket ===
Kellogg College has a cricket team which plays in the League and Cuppers intercollegiate competitions. The club was established in 2022. In the 2025-2026 season, Kellogg won the League title.

=== Football ===
Kellogg's football club was founded in Michaelmas 2012 and has been competing in the third division of the university's Middle Common Room Football League since.

== Traditions ==
=== Coat of arms ===
The chevron on the left hand side is a stylised depiction of a Gothic arch from Rewley Abbey which gave its name to the original home of the College in Wellington Square. Passing through the arch is the open book of learning symbolising the access to knowledge which is at the heart of Kellogg’s mission. On the right is an ear of wheat in recognition of the original benefactor of the College. The jagged line that divides the two halves represents the marriage between benefaction and learning and the points add up to the number of the 11 Founding Fellows.

— Malcolm Airs, Kellogg College – The First 25 Years

=== College grace ===
Kellogg's College grace has the distinction of being the only grace in the Welsh language at any Oxbridge college. It was chosen to commemorate the foundation of the college on St David's Day in 1990. The Welsh text, written by W.D. Williams, and its translation read:

O Dad, yn deulu dedwydd – y deuwn
A diolch o newydd,
Cans o'th law y daw bob dydd
Ein lluniaeth a'n llawenydd.

Translation:

O Father, as a happy family – we come
With thanks anew,
For from thy hand we receive each day
Our sustenance and our joy.

=== Tartan ===
The Kellogg College tartan was designed by Robert Collins for the Burns Supper 2013. It is registered with the Scottish Register of Tartans and may only be worn by fellows, students and alumni of Kellogg College and those invited to do so by the president of the college. The tartan is composed of four colours; red, white and blue of the college crest, and gold representing an ear of wheat.

== Notable people associated with Kellogg ==
=== Presidents ===
- Geoffrey Thomas (1990–2007)
- Jonathan Michie (2008–present)

=== Notable fellows ===
- Malcolm Airs, Emeritus; Professor of Conservation and the Historic Environment, received an OBE in the 2019 Birthday Honours
- Colin Bundy, Warden, Green College; formerly Director and Principal, School of Oriental and African Studies and Deputy Vice Chancellor, University of London; and previously Vice Chancellor and Principal, University of the Witwatersrand
- Radhika Coomaraswamy, Human Rights Commissioner for Sri Lanka
- Andrew D. Hamilton, former Vice–Chancellor of the University of Oxford, former president and current Professor of New York University
- Christof Heyns, Dean, Faculty of Law, University of Pretoria
- Sir Tony Hoare, James Martin Professor of Computing, Oxford University since 1977; Emeritus Fellow, Wolfson College; 2000 Kyoto Prize Laureate in Advanced Technology
- W James Kennedy, Professorial Fellow, ex-Director, Oxford University Museum of Natural History
- Russell Mawby, Chairman Emeritus, W. K. Kellogg Foundation
- Juan E. Méndez, Professor of International Law, University of Notre Dame; First Vice-president, Inter-American Human Rights Commission
- Louise Richardson, Vice-Chancellor of the University of Oxford
- William Schabas, Professor of Human Rights Law, Faculty of Law, and Director, Irish Centre for Human Rights, National University of Ireland, Galway
- Richard Smethurst, Director, Department for External Studies 1976–1986; Chairman of the General Board of Faculties 1989–1991; Provost of Worcester College
- Vincent Strudwick, theological educator
- Joan Thirsk, Reader Emeritus in Economic History; Honorary Fellow, St. Hilda's College
- Geoffrey P Thomas, President Emeritus of Kellogg College; Fellow of Linacre College, 1978–1990; Honorary Fellow of Linacre College
- David Vaisey, Bodley's Librarian Emeritus; Professorial Fellow, Exeter College; Keeper of the University Archives; Bodley's Librarian 1986–1996
- Geraldine Van Bueren, Professor of International Human Rights Law, Queen Mary College, University of London
- Carl Heneghan, Professor of Evidence-Based Medicine and director of the University of Oxford's Centre for Evidence-Based Medicine.

=== Honorary and visiting fellows ===
- Lord Karan Bilimoria, Bynum Tudor Visiting Fellow 2017–2018; life peer, founder and chairman of Cobra Beer
- Charles III, Bynum Tudor Honorary Fellow 2019-2020
- Umberto Eco, Honorary Fellow and author of The Name of the Rose and Foucault's Pendulum
- P. D. James, Baroness James of Holland Park, novelist and crime writer
- Sir Ralph Kohn, Bynum Tudor Visiting Fellow; pharmacologist, entrepreneur, musician
- Kenneth Lonergan, Visiting Fellow and Artist in Residence, Oscar-winning screenwriter and film director
- Phumzile Mlambo-Ngcuka, Bynum Tudor Visiting Fellow, United Nations Under-Secretary-General and the executive director of UN Women
- David Puttnam, Lord Puttnam of Queensgate, Bynum Tudor Visiting Fellow
- Hector Sants, Bynum Tudor Visiting Fellow, Partner and Vice Chairman, Oliver Wyman
- Desmond Tutu, Bynum Tudor Visiting Fellow; Archbishop; Laureate of the Nobel Peace Prize
- La June Montgomery Tabron, president and CEO of the Kellogg Foundation

=== Notable alumni ===
- Paul Bennett, British rower, Olympics gold medallist
- Grace Clough, British rower, Paralympics gold medallist
- Charlie Cole, American rower
- Ante Kušurin, Croatian rower
- Joseph von Maltzahn, British rower
- Tom Mitchell, British rugby player, Olympics silver medallist
- J. C. Niala, Kenyan writer
- Theresa Lola, British-Nigerian writer
- Prajwal Parajuly, author, novelist
- Andy Saull, British rugby player
- Kevin Tkachuk, Canadian rugby player
- Kyle Traynor, Scottish rugby player
- Dom Waldouck, English rugby player
- Ruby Wax, actress, comedian, and mental health campaigner
- Jingan Young, Hong Kong born playwright
- Syed Nizamuddin Bin Sayed Khassim, Malaysian diplomat, author, and columnist
