= Syed Nizamuddin =

Syed Nizamuddin may refer to:

- Nizamuddin Auliya, an Indian Sunni Muslim scholar, Sufi saint.
- Syed Nizamuddin Bin Sayed Khassim, a Malaysian author, columnist and diplomat.
- Sathyajith (actor), an Indian actor who is known off-screen by his real name, Syed Nizamuddin.
