= Geoffrey Thomas (academic) =

Welsh academic

Geoffrey Price Thomas FLSW (born 3 July 1941) was President of Kellogg College, Oxford, and Director of Oxford University Department for Continuing Education until 2008.

He was educated at Maesteg Grammar School, University of Wales (Swansea) (BSc, First Class Honours, Physics) and Churchill College, Cambridge (PhD). He also has a Master of Arts from the University of Oxford.

After one year as a research associate at the Cavendish Laboratory at the University of Cambridge (1966–67), he became a Staff Tutor at the University College of Swansea (1967–78). In 1978, he moved to the University of Oxford as a Fellow of Linacre College and Deputy Director of the Department of External Studies. In 1986, he became Director of the Oxford University Department for Continuing Education. He remained a Fellow of Linacre until 1990, when he became the first President of Kellogg College and an Honorary Fellow of Linacre.

He has been a visiting scholar at the Smithsonian Institution, Harvard University, the University of Washington, the University of California, Berkeley, and Northern Illinois University. In 2002, he delivered the Louise McBee Lecture at the University of Georgia.

He was a member of the Higher Education Funding Council for Wales from 2000-2008, and has been a member of the Council of the British Association for the Advancement of Science, a member of the Universities Association for Continuing Education, and a member of the Cabinet Office Committee of Inquiry on the Public Understanding of Science.

Since 2002, he has been a member of the International Adult and Continuing Education Hall of Fame. He has been a Governor of the University of Glamorgan and a Council member of the University of Wales and University of Wales Trinity Saint David (Chair 2010-2014). He is Chairman of Global Teacher Education Inc., the U.S.-based foundation for promoting international education. In 2014, he was elected a Fellow of the Learned Society of Wales and was awarded an Honorary DSc by the University of Wales Trinity Saint David.

== Books ==
- Frank Barnaby and Geoffrey Thomas, eds, The nuclear arms race — control or catastrophe?: proceedings of the General Section of the British Association for the Advancement of Science 1981 (London: Pinter, 1982).
- Sir Douglas Black and G. P. Thomas, eds, Providing for the health services: proceedings of Section X (General) of the British Association for the Advancement of Science 139th annual meeting, 1977 (London: Croom Helm, 1978).
- Bruce Davies and Geoffrey Thomas, eds, Science and sporting performance: management or manipulation? (Oxford: Clarendon Press, 1982).

== Sources and further information ==
- Terrence Nowlin, 'Kellogg College president will deliver annual McBee Lecture', Columns (18 November 2002)
- HEFCW Council Members
- International Adult and Continuing Education Hall of Fame
- Debrett's People of Today (12th edn, London: Debrett's Peerage, 1999), pp. 1931–2

Academic offices
Preceded by None	President of Kellogg College, Oxford; 1990–2008	Succeeded by Jonathan Michie
