= Malcolm Airs =

British academic

Malcolm Russell Airs OBE FSA FRHS (born March 1941) is emeritus professor of conservation and the historic environment at Kellogg College, University of Oxford and Emeritus Professor, Department of Education.

His main research work focussed on the building processes and craftsmanship of the Tudor and Stuart periods.

Airs was appointed Officer of the Order of the British Empire (OBE) in the 2019 Birthday Honours for services to the historic environment, conservation and education.

A conference was held in 2016 at Rewley House, Oxford to honour Airs who taught there from 1975 to 2006 and the papers presented were published in Barnwell & Henderson (2017).

== Selected publications ==
- Airs, M. (1975). The Making of the English Country House, 1500-1640. Architectural Press.
- Airs, M. (1995). The Tudor & Jacobean Country House: A Building History. Sutton Pub Limited.
- Airs, M., William Whyte and the Society of Architectural Historians of Great Britain. (2013). Architectural History After Colvin : The Society of Architectural Historians of Great Britain Symposium 2011. Donington: Shaun Tys.
