= Jonathan Michie =

British economist (born 1957)

Jonathan Michie OBE FAcSS (born 25 March 1957, London, England) is a British economist and academic. He is President of Kellogg College, Professor of Innovation and Knowledge Exchange, and Pro-Vice-Chancellor at the University of Oxford. His research focuses on political economy, innovation policy, industrial strategy, labour economics, lifelong learning, and cooperative and employee-owned enterprises. He was awarded an OBE in the 2022 New Year Honours for services to education and lifelong learning.

== Early life ==
Michie is the son of the biologist Dame Anne McLaren and computer scientist Donald Michie.

== Academic career ==
Michie studied at the United World College of the Atlantic from 1973 to 1975 where he gained his International Baccalaureate. He later became Chair of the UWC Board.

He was awarded an open entrance scholarship to Balliol College, Oxford, where he gained first class honours in Philosophy, Politics and Economics from 1976 to 1979, and later a doctorate, after having obtained an MSc in Economics (with Distinction) from Queen Mary, University of London.

In 1983 he moved to the Economic Department of the Trades Union Congress and then in 1988 to Brussels as an Expert to the European Commission, before becoming an academic at the University of Cambridge in 1990. After seven years at Cambridge – first in the Economics Faculty and then the Judge Business School – he took up the Sainsbury Chair of Management at Birkbeck University of London, where he was head of the School of Management & Organizational Psychology.

In 2004, he became a professor of management at the University of Birmingham where he was director of the Birmingham Business School and a member of the University Council. He was also a non-executive director of the Sandwell & West Birmingham Hospitals NHS Trust.

In December 2007, he was appointed to the joint positions of Director of Oxford University Department for Continuing Education and President of Kellogg College, Oxford. He stood down as director of the department in 2021.

In 2020 he became Chair of the Universities Association for Lifelong Learning (UALL), the representative body for universities involved in continuing education and lifelong learning across the United Kingdom. Through this role he has promoted collaboration between higher education institutions, government and employers to improve access to education for mature students, professionals and underrepresented groups.

He has served for many years as Managing Editor of the International Review of Applied Economics and has authored and edited numerous influential reference works, including A Reader's Guide to the Social Sciences, The Handbook of Globalisation, The Political Economy of the Environment, Advanced Introduction to Globalisation, and The Oxford Handbook of Mutual, Co-operative, and Co-owned Business. He also authored a report which called for Northern Rock to be remutualised.

=== Shareholders United ===
Michie was one of the first chairpersons of Shareholders United, formerly Shareholders United Against Murdoch, a not-for-profit organisation dedicated to promote fan ownership in Manchester United Football Club. They successfully thwarted Rupert Murdoch's attempt to take over Manchester United. When his term as chair passed in 2004, Shareholders United had over 30,000 members and owned 1% of Manchester United. The organization is now known as the Manchester United Supporters' Trust.

== Research and scholarship ==
Jonathan Michie's research spans economics, innovation studies, political economy, corporate governance and lifelong learning, with a particular emphasis on the relationship between institutions, ownership structures and long-term economic performance.

His work combines economic theory with public policy analysis and has focused on how innovation, education, labour markets and corporate governance influence productivity, competitiveness and inclusive economic development. Throughout his career, he has sought to bridge academic research with policy making through collaborations with governments, international organizations and industry.

Michie's early scholarship examined industrial competitiveness, technological change and economic restructuring in advanced economies. Drawing on political economy and innovation studies, he argued that long-term competitiveness depends not only on market competition but also on investment in skills, innovation systems, institutional capacity and productive corporate governance. His research challenged approaches centred exclusively on deregulation and market liberalization, instead emphasizing the importance of coordinated economic institutions and public policy in sustaining innovation and productivity growth. These themes were developed in works including The Political Economy of Competitiveness and Globalization, Growth, and Governance, which explored how technological innovation, industrial policy and governance interact to shape national economic performance.

A major strand of Michie's research has addressed the economics of globalization. Rather than treating globalization as an inevitable or uniform process, he has examined how different institutional arrangements influence its economic and social outcomes. His publications analyze the effects of international trade, foreign investment, labor markets and financial integration on growth, inequality and employment, arguing that public policy plays a central role in ensuring that global economic integration supports sustainable and inclusive development. He has edited successive editions of The Handbook of Globalization, bringing together interdisciplinary research on the economic, political and social dimensions of globalization.

Michie is widely recognized for his research on mutual, co-operative and employee-owned enterprises. At the University of Oxford he founded and directs the Oxford Centre on Mutual and Co-owned Business, where his research examines how ownership structures affect corporate governance, resilience, innovation and long-term business performance.

Michie's research has analyzed innovation systems and knowledge exchange between universities, industry and government. He has examined the role of higher education institutions in regional development, technology transfer and lifelong learning, arguing that universities contribute not only through research but also through education, collaboration and civic engagement. His scholarship has explored mechanisms through which knowledge generated within universities can support business innovation, public services and economic development, reflecting his academic appointment as Professor of Innovation and Knowledge Exchange.

Michie has written extensively on adult education, continuing education and workforce skills, arguing that lifelong learning is essential for innovation, productivity and democratic participation in rapidly changing economies. He has also examined the role of the social sciences in informing evidence-based public policy, themes developed in edited works including Why the Social Sciences Matter.

== Selected publications ==
- Michie, Jonathan; Cooper, Cary L., eds. (2025). Why the Social Sciences Matter. London: Palgrave Macmillan UK. doi:10.1057/9781137269928. ISBN 978-1-137-26991-1.
- Michie, Jonathan (2019). The Handbook of Globalisation (3rd ed.). Edward Elgar Publishing. ISBN 978-0-85793-144-3.
- Christopherson, S.; Michie, J.; Tyler, P. (2010). "Regional resilience: theoretical and empirical perspectives". Cambridge Journal of Regions, Economy and Society. 3 (1). doi:10.1093/cjres/rsq004. ISSN 1752-1378.
- Michie, Jonathan; Sheehan, Maura (2005). "Business strategy, human resources, labour market flexibility and competitive advantage". The International Journal of Human Resource Management. 16 (3): 445–464. doi:10.1080/0958519042000339598. ISSN 0958-5192.
- Wall, Toby D.; Michie, Jonathan; Patterson, Malcolm; Wood, Stephen J.; Sheehan, Maura; Clegg, Chris W.; West, Michael (2004). "ON THE VALIDITY OF SUBJECTIVE MEASURES OF COMPANY PERFORMANCE". Personnel Psychology. 57 (1): 95–118. doi:10.1111/j.1744-6570.2004.tb02485.x.
- Guest, David E.; Michie, Jonathan; Conway, Neil; Sheehan, Maura (2003). "Human Resource Management and Corporate Performance in the UK". British Journal of Industrial Relations. 41 (2): 291–314. doi:10.1111/1467-8543.00273. ISSN 1467-8543.
- Archibugi, Daniele; Michie, Jonathan (1995). "The globalisation of technology: a new taxonomy". Cambridge Journal of Economics. 19 (1): 121–140. doi:10.1093/oxfordjournals.cje.a035299. ISSN 0309-166X.
- Michie, Jonathan; Sheehan, Maura (2003). "Labour market deregulation, 'flexibility' and innovation". Cambridge Journal of Economics. 27 (1): 123–143. doi:10.1093/cje/27.1.123. ISSN 0309-166X.
- Michie, Jonathan (2017). Advanced Introduction to Globalisation. Edward Elgar Publishing. ISBN 978-1-78471-070-5.

== Personal life ==
He is married to Carolyn Downs and they have two sons.

Academic offices
Preceded by Geoffrey Thomas	President of Kellogg College, Oxford; 2008–	Succeeded by Incumbent
