= Omar Shahin =

American-Jordanian imam and activist

Sheikh Omar Shahin is a Jordanian native, living in the United States. He came to the United States in 1995, and became a U.S. citizen in 2003. He was Imam at the Islamic Center of Tucson in Arizona from 2000 until 2003, when he co-founded North American Imams Federation. He is currently president of the executive committee of this organization. In addition to being an Imam, Shahin is also licensed to practice jurisprudence law as an Islamic Attorney in the courts of Amman, Jordan. He is a lecturer at the American Open University. He is also the dean of the Islamic Studies program at Graduate Theological Foundation, where he has been teaching since 2004.

== Academic ==
Omar Shahin is Professor of Islamic Law and Director of Islamic Studies at the Graduate Theological Foundation in South Bend, Indiana. He holds the High Diploma from Jordan University. He also holds degrees in Islamic Studies from Islamic University in Almedina Almonwara, Saudi Arabia, and Sudan. He studied at Almedina Almonwara, Saudi Arabia in the early 1980s He is licensed to practice jurisprudence law as an Islamic Attorney in the courts of Amman, Jordan. Imam Shahin holds both the Master of Theology and the Doctor of Philosophy from the Graduate Theological Foundation. He also holds a Master's degree from Alazhar in Egypt.

== Involvement in Flying imams controversy ==
In November 2006, he became a spokesperson in the flying imams controversy, in which he was personally involved; he and five other imams (Didmar Faja, Marwan Sadeddin, Mohamed Said Mitwaly Ibrahim, Ahmad Shqeirat, and Mahmoud Sulaiman) were taken off a US Airways flight before it left Minneapolis for Phoenix, Arizona. Shahin and his companions were returning to Arizona from a meeting of the North American Imams Federation in Minnesota. Critics have questioned whether the event was manufactured to create publicity around planned congressional legislation against profiling in public transportation and law enforcement introduced by Rep. John Conyers of Detroit who is likely to chair the House Judiciary Committee in the 110th Congress coordinated with groups such as the Muslim American Society Freedom Foundation and CAIR.

The day following the incident Shahin spoke to the press who had gathered when he returned to a US Airways ticket counter to buy new tickets for the group. He told media that the incident was, "humiliating, the worst moment of my life," and asked if, "To practice your faith and pray is a crime in America?" When US Airways would not issue him and the other Imams new tickets he called for a boycott of the airline and said, "I'm not going to stay silent...I came to this country to enjoy justice and freedom." He has said it is incorrect that any of the men had one-way tickets, because he purchased all of the tickets himself and can prove this, and that he had alerted the FBI to the conference in order to prevent this kind of incident from occurring.

The six imams filed a lawsuit in the Federal District Court of Minnesota in March 2007. The lawsuit named US Airways and the Minneapolis-St. Paul Metropolitan Airports Commission as defendants. The lawsuit gained national media attention as it also named as-yet-unnamed "John Doe" passengers who "may have made false reports against plaintiffs solely with the intent to discriminate against them on the basis of their race, religion, ethnicity and national origin."

Legal protection for citizens reporting suspicious activity in good faith was included in the "Implementing Recommendations of the 9/11 Commission Act of 2007," passed by Congress and signed by President Bush on August 3, 2007. The "John Doe" defendants were dismissed from the lawsuit on August 22.

== Views ==
He has expressed doubt that any sincere Muslims were responsible for the 9/11 hijackings, since, according to him, over 3000 innocents died in the World Trade Center attack—the implication being that true Muslims would not kill innocent people if they were also Muslims. moreover, as several of the hijackers attended a strip club, their actions were not in accordance with Islamic morality.

He has also written that a "Western law" should submit to Sharia law should the two conflict. Writes Shahin: "A Muslim must try his best to abide by the rulings of Sharia whenever possible as much as he can. He should not allow himself to be liable to those western laws that contradict the clear-cut Islamic rulings."

== Books ==
- The Muslim Family in Western Society A Study in Islamic Law ISBN 978-1-929569-30-4 (English) ISBN 978-1-929569-29-8 (Arabic)

== See also ==
- Muslim American Society
