= John Henry Morgan =

American philosopher

- Born: February 9, 1945 (age 80); Mount Pleasant, Texas, U.S.
- Occupation(s): Professor and theologian
- Known for: Former President of the Graduate Theological Foundation

John Henry Morgan (born February 9, 1945) is the Karl Mannheim Professor of the History and Philosophy of Social Sciences at the Graduate Theological Foundation, where he also served as president until 2013. A prolific author, his academic work has explored the intersection of theology, philosophy, psychology and culture.

== Early life and education ==
Morgan was born in Mt. Pleasant, Texas, on February 9, 1945, to B.A. Morgan Sr. and Kate Evelyn Morgan. He grew up in Texas but received his undergraduate education in New England.

Morgan earned his bachelor's degree from Berkshire College in 1968, and his master's from Hartford Seminary in 1970. He was also awarded a Ph.D. from Hartford Seminary in 1972, a Doctor of Science degree from the London College of Applied Science in 1986 and a Doctor of Psychology degree from Foundation House, Oxford, in 2000.

== Academic career ==
Morgan was a postdoctoral research fellow at Yale University from 1972 to 1974, and a postdoctoral resident fellow at Princeton Theological Seminary from 1977 to 1978. He was a National Science Foundation Science Faculty Fellow at the University of Notre Dame from 1979 to 1980.

He has been a postdoctoral visiting fellow at Harvard University three times—1998; 2011; and 2015.

He also was a postdoctoral research scholar the University of Chicago from 1985 to 1986.

Morgan is a senior fellow of Foundation House/Oxford and is a member of the advisory board for the Centre for the Study of Religion in Public Life at Oxford University. He currently serves as a senior fellow at All Saints Cathedral College in Alberta, Canada.

From 1998 to 2011, he taught at the Oxford Theology Summer School, part of the Oxford University Department for Continuing Education, where he was appointed to the program's board of studies in 1995. He has also been visiting scholar at Harvard University in 1998, 2011, and 2015.

=== Founding of Graduate Theological Foundation ===
The Graduate Theological Foundation was founded in 1962 in the wake of the Second Vatican Council. The Conference on Religious Development was commissioned to foster growing ecumenical relationships between Catholic and Protestant communions. The foundation emerged from a variety of residential programs held by the Conference in Madison, Connecticut.

Initially formed as a traditional continuing education center for practicing clergy, the foundation gradually evolved into a self-directed education model where most of the students and faculty reside around the globe. Faculty come from a broad spectrum of faith backgrounds, and many also serve on the faculty of established colleges and universities, including the University of Oxford, with which the foundation has a continuing education affiliation through the Oxford Theology Summer School.

Morgan served as president of the foundation from 1982 to 2013.

== Published works ==
Morgan is the author of more than 30 books and numerous scholarly articles. His religious affiliation is Quaker, and he has written extensively about the Quaker experience in America. His writing has appeared in a wide range of periodicals, including Contemporary Islamic Studies, the Journal of Religion & Society and Psychological Thought. His latest book is entitled CLINICAL PSYCHOTHERAPY: A History of Theory and Practice (from Sigmund Freud to Aaron Beck).

=== Partial bibliography ===
- Naturally Good: The Behavioral History of Moral Development (from Charles Darwin to E.O. Wilson) (2005) ISBN 1-9295-6913-0
- Being Human: Perspectives on Meaning and Interpretation: Essays in Religion, Culture and Personality (2006) ISBN 1-9295-6916-5
- “In the Beginning…”: The Paleolithic Origins of Religious Consciousness (2007) ISBN 1-9295-6941-6
- The New Paradigm in Ministry Education: A Radical Philosophy of Collaboration (2008) ISBN 1-9295-6948-3
- Muslim Clergy in America: Ministry as Profession in the Islamic Community (2010) ISBN 1-5560-5402-5
- Psychology of Religion: A Commentary on the Classic Texts (2011) ISBN 978-1556054358
- Beyond Divine Intervention: The Biology of Right and Wrong (2009) ISBN 978-1556053986
- After the Call: A Structural and Functional Analysis of the Ministry Profession (2013) www.gtfeducation.org
- Understanding Ourselves: Essays in the History and Philosophy of the Social Sciences (2014, 2017 2nd ed.) www.gtfeducation.org
- Clinical Psychotherapy: A History of Theory and Practice (From Freud to Beck) (2015, 2017 2nd ed.) www.gtfeducation.org
- Psychopathology: A Clinical Guide to Personality Disorders (2018) www.gtfeducation.org
- An Encyclopedic Dictionary of Interpersonal Psychotherapy (2018) (MacBain & Boyd, publishers)
- Child Psychopathology in Clinical Practice: The Psychoanalytic Theories of Horney, Klein, and Anna Freud (2019) (MacBain & Boyd, publishers)
