= Norman Solomon (rabbi) =

British Orthodox rabbi (born 1933)

- Born: May 31, 1933 (age 93); Cardiff, South Wales

Academic background
- Education: University of Manchester

Norman Solomon (born 31 May 1933) is a British rabbi, professor, and scholar in the field of Jewish studies and Jewish–Christian relations.

== Biography ==
Norman Solomon was born in Cardiff, South Wales in 1933 and attended Cardiff High School and St. John's College, Cambridge. He attained rabbinic ordination at Jews' College (London School of Jewish Studies) in London, England and a Ph.D. at the University of Manchester. He served Orthodox congregations in Manchester, Liverpool, London and Birmingham, England. He was later director of the Centre for the Study of Judaism and Jewish-Christian Relations at the Selly Oak Colleges, Birmingham and a Fellow in Modern Jewish Thought at the Oxford Centre for Hebrew and Jewish Studies. He was also lecturer in Theology at the University of Oxford. He currently holds the position of Professor of Judaica at the Graduate Theological Foundation.

A former Vice President of the World Congress of Faiths, a Patron of the International Interfaith Centre and an Adviser to the International Council of Christians and Jews, he has been actively involved in interfaith dialogue with Christians and Muslims. He has written five books and over seventy articles on a wide range of issues in the fields of Jewish studies and Jewish–Christian relations. He has also edited a number of volumes in these fields. His major works include his books Judaism and World Religion, The Analytic Movement: Hayyim Soloveitchik and His School, The Talmud: A Selection and Torah from Heaven.

== Publications ==
- Judaism and World Religion (1991)
- (1991), "The Soloveitchik Line (On Interfaith Dialogue)," Dan Cohn-Sherbok (ed.), Problems in Contemporary Jewish Theology, pp. 225–240
- The Analytic Movement: Hayyim Soloveitchik and His School (1993)
- A Very Short Introduction to Judaism (1996)
- Judaism: A Brief Insight (1996)
- Historical Dictionary of Judaism (1998)
- The Talmud: A Selection (2009)
- Torah from Heaven (2012)
- Making Sense of "God" (2023)

=== As co-editor ===
- Norman Solomon, Richard Harries, Timothy Winter (eds): Abraham's Children: Jews, Christians and Muslims in Conversation, pp 9–17, London and New York: T & T Clark (2005). ISBN 0567 08171-0 (hardback); ISBN 0567 08161-3 (paperback)
- Alexander Knapp and Norman Solomon (eds): Ernest Bloch Studies. Cambridge University Press, 2016.

== Sources ==
- His CV at the centre for Jewish Studies
