= La June Montgomery Tabron =

Nonprofit executive

- Born: Detroit, Michigan, U.S.
- Education: University of Michigan, Ann Arbor (BBA); Northwestern University (MBA)
- Title: President and CEO of Kellogg Foundation
- Term: 2013–present

La June Montgomery Tabron is a nonprofit executive who serves as president and CEO of the Kellogg Foundation.

She is the 9th leader of Kellogg Foundation, the first woman CEO as well as the first African American CEO of the Foundation and succeeds Sterling K. Speirn as the CEO of the foundation. Tabron was previously executive vice president of operations and treasurer.

== Education ==
Tabron has a bachelor's degree in business administration from the University of Michigan in Ann Arbor, and a master's degree in business administration from the Kellogg Graduate School of Management at Northwestern University in Evanston Ill. She also serves as president of the board of the Western Michigan University Foundation and is a board member of the Bronson Healthcare group.

== Recognition ==
Tabron was the virtual commencement speaker in June 2020 at the UCLA Fielding School of Public Health.

She received the Bynum Tudor Fellowship from Kellogg College, Oxford University in July 2020.
