= Vincent Strudwick =

Vincent Noel Harold Strudwick (1932–2025) was a British Church of England priest, canon, theologian and educationalist. His areas of expertise included sixteenth-century English history and the ecclesiology of Richard Hooker.

== Education ==
After serving as a Pilot Officer in the Royal Air Force, Strudwick entered Kelham Theological College (1952), which was run by the Society of the Sacred Mission. He also studied at the University of Nottingham, where he received a Bachelor of Arts degree in history. He later received a Diploma in Adult Education from the University of London (1979).

== Ordination ==
In 1959 he was ordained deacon in the Church of England and the following year he was ordained priest. He was a tutor at Kelham Theological College 1959-63 and Sub-Warden and House Master 1963–70. From 1970 until 1973 he served as Assistant Curate of St John the Baptist's Church, Crawley. From 1973 until 1977 he was Rector of Fittleworth and at the same time he became Adult Education Adviser for the Diocese of Chichester and Tutor in Reformation Studies at Chichester Theological College. He was Ecumenical Planning Officer for Education for Milton Keynes 1977–80, living in association with the Society of the Sacred Mission at Willen with his wife and three children. He was also a part-time Tutor with the St Albans Ministerial Training Scheme.

== Oxford ==
In 1980 he moved to Oxford, becoming diocesan Director of Education and Training until 1988, while also serving as Continuing Ministerial Education Adviser 1985–89. In 1989 he became Director of the Diocesan Institute for Theological Education, serving as Principal of the Oxford Ministry Course until 1994 and Principal of the St Albans and Oxford Ministry Course 1994–97.

In 1994 he became a Fellow and Tutor of Kellogg College, Oxford, and a member of the Theology Faculty, being granted the status of a Master of Arts in the university. He was made Fellow Emeritus of Kellogg in 2000 and was chamberlain of the college from 1997 to 2008. Strudwick was made an Honorary Fellow in 2007.

Between 1997 and 2000 he served as Director of Religious Studies for the Department for Continuing Education. He was Associate Chaplain of Corpus Christi College, Oxford, from 1999 to 2007 and taught on numerous out-of-term programmes such as the Smithsonian and continued with tutorial work for the Faculty of Theology as an Emeritus member. He founded the Oxford Theology Summer Programme held at Christ Church in 1993 and continued to teach on it until 2011.

He taught for the Centre for Medieval and Renaissance Studies and other institutions including the Graduate Theological Foundation of Indiana (USA), where he holds the position of Bishop John Tinsley Professor of Anglican Theology. He was also visiting lecturer in Anglicanism at St Stephen's House, Oxford until 2011.

== Honorary Canon ==
Strudwick has been an Honorary Canon of Christ Church, Oxford since 1982 and on 21 July 2009 he was awarded the Lambeth Degree of Doctor of Divinity by the Archbishop of Canterbury for his "outstanding work in theological and ministerial education and as an historian for his research on the English Reformation and Richard Hooker".
