= Wellington Square, Oxford =

Garden square in central Oxford, England

Coordinates: 51°45′28″N 1°15′44″W

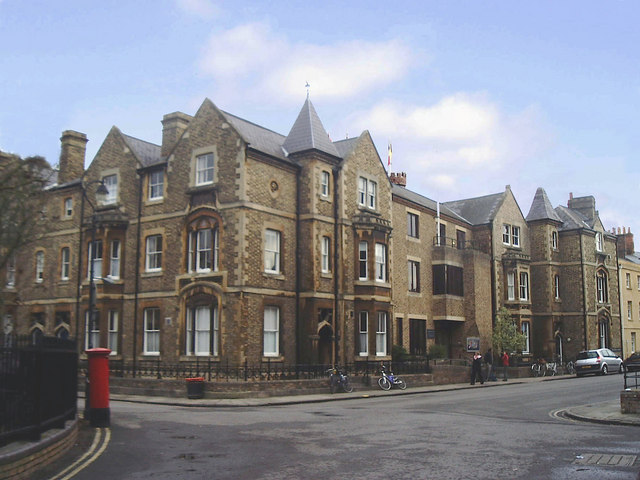
Rewley House on the south side of Wellington Square at the junction with St John Street (on the right).

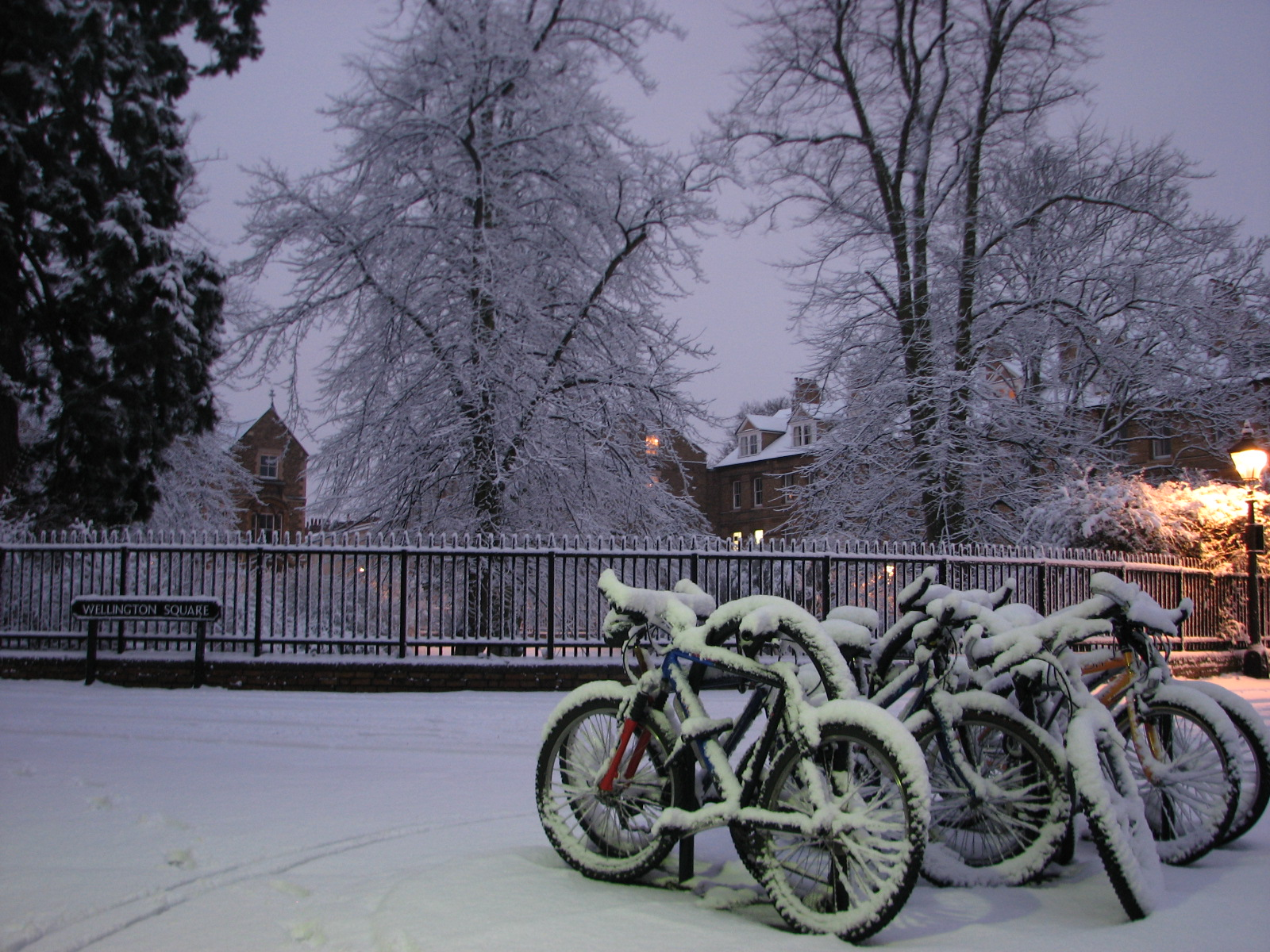
Wellington Square in the snow.

Wellington Square is the only garden square in central Oxford, England, a continuation northwards of St John Street. In the centre of the square is a small park, Wellington Square Gardens, owned by the University of Oxford. A bicycle route passes into Little Clarendon Street through the pedestrian area at the front of the University Offices in the north-east of the square.

The street name is used to refer metonymically to the central administration of the University of Oxford, which in 1975 moved from the Clarendon Building to new buildings with an address in the square but built at that time, along with graduate student accommodation, along the adjacent Little Clarendon Street. In May 2024, 16 students were arrested in the administration offices during a sit-in protest for Palestine, part of the wider Oxford Action For Palestine movement.

The university's Department for Continuing Education is in the square in Rewley House, which was designed in 1872 by the Oxford architect E. G. Bruton, who also laid out the square. This was the initial location of Kellogg College. Number 47 houses the administrative offices of the Faculty of Medieval and Modern Languages, as well as the university's Slavic and Modern Greek collections. Barnett House (named after the social reformer Canon Samuel Barnett and his wife Henrietta), home of the Department of Social Policy and Intervention is found along one side of the square.

The Oxford University Broadcasting Society used a studio of Radio Oxford in the square.

In 2026, demolition of a large 1970s block of student accommodation to the square's north was approved, with plans to replace it with university offices and academic and teaching space.

== Palestinian protests and occupation ==
On 23 May, protesters occupied the office building of Vice-Chancellor Irene Tracey, overlooking Wellington Square, hanging a Palestinian flag and list of demands out of an office window. Thames Valley Police made an initial 16 arrests on suspicion of aggravated trespass, and one on suspicion of common assault, after the university authorities called the police. A 17th arrest was later made. The university reported that at least 12 of those arrested were current students. According to a protester, they agreed to leave when police said they would be arrested if they did not, but they were arrested anyway. They were released on conditional bail that night.
