= Temba Mafico =

Themba (or Temba) Mafico
- Born: Gwenzi in the District of Chipinge, Zimbabwe
- Education: University of London; Harvard Divinity School; Harvard Graduate School of Art and Sciences
- Occupations: Minister, Professor, Administrator, Spiritual Mentor
- Notable work: Yahweh's Emergence As "Judge" Among the Gods: A Study of the Hebrew Root Špt
- Spouse: Roslyn (née Brake) Mafico
- Children: David Mafico, Erika Willingham, Sean Ramsey

Themba (or Temba) Mafico is a Christian scholar and author. He was born in 1943 in then-Southern Rhodesia. As of 2019 he was president and CEO of the Mafico Leadership Renewal Institute based in Atlanta. He is a distinguished professor of Old Testament/Hebrew Bible—the bulk of his teaching and administrative career spent at the Interdenominational Theological Center in Atlanta—and has been a church minister for over fifty years. He earned a Th.M., M.A., and Ph.D. in Old Testament from Harvard University. His major publication is the book Yahweh's Emergence As "judge" Among the Gods: A Study of the Hebrew Root Špt. He has also made several contributions to the Anchor Bible Dictionary, Abingdon Bible Dictionary, The International Bible Commentary.

== Early years ==
Mafico was born on January 28, 1943, at Gwenzi in the Chipinge District, a remote part of Zimbabwe (formerly Southern Rhodesia). He was the fifth-born child in a family of thirteen children. He attended Gwenzi Primary School, a satellite of Mount Selinda Mission that was established by the American Board of Commissioners for Foreign Missions (now United Church of Christ Board for World Ministries), and Chikore Secondary School. After completing the Rhodesia Junior Certificate, in 1958 Mafico enrolled to take the Cambridge School Certificate at Hartzell Secondary School near the city of Mutare. He paid for school by doing menial work after school hours. In 1960, Mafico began his theological education at Epworth Theological School (now United Theological College) in Harare. Following graduation in December 1962, Mafico was appointed pastor of the urban church of the United Church of Christ (formerly ABM). In 1968 he enrolled at the University of London Rhodesia campus, and in 1970 he graduated as the first Rhodesian pastor to earn a bachelor's degree majoring in religious studies and history. Upon graduation, he taught Religious Knowledge, and was the first black school chaplain at Chikore High School.

== Later years ==
In August 1971, Mafico enrolled at Harvard Divinity School to pursue a master's degree in theology (Th.M.), which he earned in 1973. He concurrently enrolled in the Ph.D. program in the Department of Near Eastern Languages and Civilizations of the Harvard Graduate School of Arts and Sciences. He graduated with both an M.A. (1977) and Ph.D. (1979), majoring in Old Testament/Hebrew Bible and history of the ancient Near East. He began teaching in the Department of Religious Studies, Classics, and Philosophy at the University of Zimbabwe in May 1979. In addition to teaching, Dr. Mafico served as the university's first chaplain. He introduced classical Hebrew into the curriculum, and mentored several students who are now scholars, such as Dora Mbuwayesango and Robert Wafawanaka. He founded the University Evening School and became its first principal with a mission to enable ex-combatants to complete their high school education following Zimbabwe's independence in 1980. Among his graduates is the former vice president of Zimbabwe, Dr. Joyce Mujuru. Currently, Mafico is distinguished professor of Old Testament/Hebrew Bible at Interdenominational Theological Center (ITC), Manicaland Development Council (MDC) (rural development), University of Zimbabwe (UZ) Choir Director, and United Church of Christ (UCC) Minister.

== Administration ==
Mafico has held many positions at ITC, including: chair of Area I: Biblical Studies and Languages; chair of Doctor of Ministries (DMin, 1992–94) degree program; associate vice president for academic services/associate provost (2003–10) and moved on to become vice president for academic services/provost (2011–2015). He resigned from administrative leadership in July 2015 to return to teaching. He now serves as the Theologian in Residence for the D.Min. degree program. He is also the editor of the Journal of the Interdenominational Theological Center (JITC) and the occasional book publications. Mafico served on the editorial Board of the Journal of Northwest Semitic Languages (1994–2006), and at the 2016 Biennial Meeting of The Association of Theological Studies of North America and Canada, he was elected to the Theological Education editorial board.

== Honors and awards ==
Inducted in the Theta Phi Honor Society (1995); twice nominated by ITC students as the best professor of the year (1994, 1997); awarded a plaque jointly by the board of trustees and ITC for his distinguished service as ITC provost and his long teaching and administrative career (Commencement 2015)

=== Membership in educational societies ===
- Society for the Study of Black Religion
- Society of Biblical Literature
- Harvard Club of Georgia
- Biblical Studies Club
- Theta Phi Honors Association

== Spiritual pilgrimages ==
From 1994 to the present, Mafico has led the first of many international pilgrimages for spiritual renewal to Syria, Jordan, Egypt, Palestine, Israel, Greece, South Africa and Zimbabwe and Ghana. From 2006 to 2010, Mafico directed a series of pilgrimages to the Holy Land for ecumenical groups of pastors sponsored by the Cousins Foundation. His organization www.maficoinstitute.com is dedicated to helping pastors/ministers to realize the importance of and practice rest, self-care, and spiritual renewal.

== Selected publications ==
- The Emergency of Yahweh as "Judge" among the Gods: A Study of the Hebrew Root Spt (New York: Edwin Mellen Press, 2007)
- "The Biblical God of the Fathers and the African Ancestors," Gerald O. West and Musa W. Dube (eds.) The Bible in Africa: Transactions, Trajectories and Trends (Leiden: Brill, 2000), 481-91]
- "Judges", International Bible Commentary (1998), 548–566, ISBN 0-8146-2454-5
- "Judge, Judging," Anchor Bible Dictionary, Volume 3 (1992), 1105–106), ISBN 0-385-19361-0.
- "Just, Justice," Anchor Bible Dictionary, Volume 3 (1992), 1127–29, ISBN 0-385-19361-0.
- "Patriarchs," New Interpreter's Dictionary of the Bible Volume 4 (2009), 398–400, ISBN 0-687-05427-3.
- "The Divine Compound Name Yahweh Elohim and Israel's Monotheistic Polytheism," Journal of Northwest Semitic Languages (1996): 155–173).
- "What can Blacks Learn from the Israelites Use and Interpretation of Biblical Texts?" Journal of the Interdenominational Theological Center Vol 38/2 (2012): 91–105).
