= W. K. Kellogg Foundation =

American non-profit philanthropic organization

- Founded: June 1930; 96 years ago
- Founder: Will Keith Kellogg
- Purpose: A number of topics
- Location: Battle Creek, Michigan
- Region served: Worldwide
- Method: Grants and programs
- President & CEO: La June Montgomery Tabron
- Endowment: $8.7 billion
- Website: www.wkkf.org
- Formerly called: W. K. Kellogg Child Welfare Foundation

The W. K. Kellogg Foundation was founded in June 1930 as the W. K. Kellogg Child Welfare Foundation by breakfast cereal pioneer Will Keith Kellogg. In 1934, Kellogg donated more than $66 million in Kellogg Company stock and other investments to the W. K. Kellogg Trust. Ninety years later, the W.K. Kellogg Foundation manages more than eight billion dollars in assets ($8.7 billion USD) and is one of the largest philanthropic foundations in the world.

== Grants ==
The foundation provides a number of grants to organizations across the United States and other countries on a number of topics.

In 2016, the Kellogg Foundation was funding more than forty projects in Native American country, with a total value of more than $30 million in open grants. According to the non-profit's website, the foundation has funded 380 Native American projects since 2008. Many grants are for health, education and language programs for children and youths. In 2009 it granted the third-highest amount of money to Native American projects, after the Robert Wood Johnson Foundation and the Ford Foundation.

In 1996, it supplied a multi-year grant worth $750,000 ($1.42 million in 2025 dollars) to start mass salt fluoridation programs which were then carried out by the Pan American Health Organization (PAHO), covering 350 million people in Bolivia, Dominican Republic, Honduras, Nicaragua, Panama, and Venezuela. The project was part of a multi-year plan launched by PAHO in 1994 to "fluoridate the entire region of the Americas." More recently, they have provided funding for HealthCorps to prevent childhood obesity by encouraging students to take personal responsibility for their health and wellness.

=== Early childhood ===
One grantee is the Birth to Five Policy Alliance, whose mission is to increase public and private support so young children, particularly those facing the most challenges, get the high-quality services they need to be successful.

=== Education ===
The foundation has made grants to prominent educational institutions, including:

- Cal Poly Pomona in Pomona, California
- Grand Valley State University
- Kellogg College, Oxford, a constituent college of the University of Oxford, United Kingdom
- Michigan State University in East Lansing, Michigan

== Programs ==
The foundation supports multiple programs for optimal child development.

In 2010, the W. K. Kellogg Foundation started a dental therapy program in five states to educate children and their families about the importance of healthy teeth. Mobile dental vans travel to rural areas to give families access to dental care. Additionally, the foundation gives grants to help minorities attend school for dentistry.

The foundation also supports New Options Initiative (For Youth), an initiative that seeks to establish new pathways connecting out-of-school young adults ages 16–24 with meaningful career opportunities.

== Perception ==
The philanthropy expert Waldemar A. Nielsen said that the Kellogg Foundation "is substantially better than it is generally seen to be."

== See also ==
- Class of Her Own
- List of wealthiest foundations
- Russell Mawby, President and CEO, 1970–1982; Chairman of the Board and CEO, 1982–1996
