= St John Street, Oxford =

Street in Oxford, England

St John Street
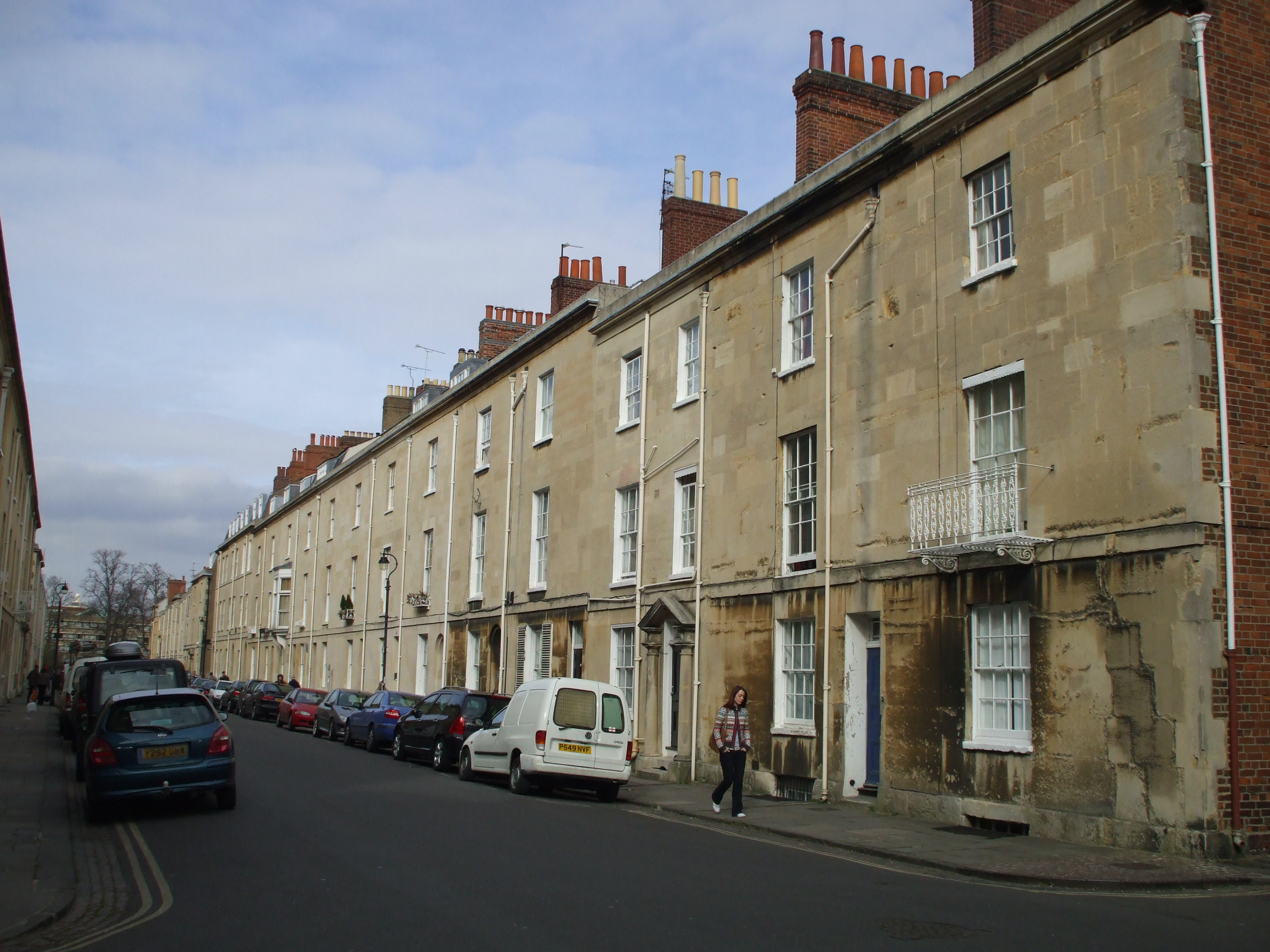
- Looking north along St John Street
- Interactive map of St John Street
- Location: Oxford, England
- Postal code: OX1
- Coordinates: 51°45′21″N 1°15′42″W

St John Street is a street in central Oxford, England. The street mainly consists of Georgian-style stone-faced Grade II listed terraced houses. It was built as a speculative development by St John's College starting in the 1820s and finishing in the 1840s at the start of the Victorian era. At the northern end is Rewley House (housing the University of Oxford Department for Continuing Education) and near the southern end is the Sackler Library, which opened in 2001. To the south is Beaumont Street and to the north is Wellington Square. St John Street runs parallel with St Giles' (linked via Pusey Street) to the east and Walton Street to the west.

Note that part of Merton Street was once known as St John Street.

== Notable residents ==
The Oxfordshire-born painter William Turner (1789–1862) (not to be confused with J. M. W. Turner) lived at No. 16 from 1833 until his death. The house is marked with a blue plaque.

Other famous residents of St John Street have included the theologians Henry Chadwick and Arthur Peacocke; authors P. D. James, Iain Pears and J. R. R. Tolkien; and musician Thom Yorke. The moral philosopher Elizabeth Anscombe lived at no. 27 from 1946. It was in her study here that she worked on her translation of Ludwig Wittgenstein's Philosophical Investigations, who also lived there towards the end of his life.

The curator of the Museum of the History of Science (in Broad Street, not far away), Kurt Josten, lived in rooms in St John Street.

The founders of the high IQ society Mensa International, Lancelot Ware and Roland Berrill, lived in rooms at 12 St John Street when they started the society in 1946.

William Ward (1807–1889), Mayor of Oxford, lived at 22 St John Street.
