= New Options Initiative (For Youth) =

New Options Initiative (NOI) is an initiative of the W. K. Kellogg Foundation (WKKF) that seeks to establish new pathways connecting out-of-school young adults ages 16 – 24 with meaningful career opportunities.

More than four million "Disconnected Youth" are isolated from meaningful work, creating challenges for them, their families and their communities. Many report that although they are motivated to succeed, their needs are not always met by the current system, in the form of job opportunities and career paths that match their passions and recognize their core capacities. At the same time, employers are more challenged than ever to recruit and identify entry level talent, and retain hard working, effective employees. The problem of human capital and effective entry level hiring processes is a pain point felt by employers of all sizes, particularly in the service industries. New Options therefore creates a value proposition for both youth and employers, bringing both into a shared space of concern, where new pathways to jobs for youth create economic gain for employers.

New Options was launched in 2006 to address the problem of how the more than four million disconnected youth in the United States can access new pathways that will lead them to living wage jobs and careers.
