= Pusey Street =

Street in central Oxford, England

Coordinates: 51.75669°N 1.26078°W

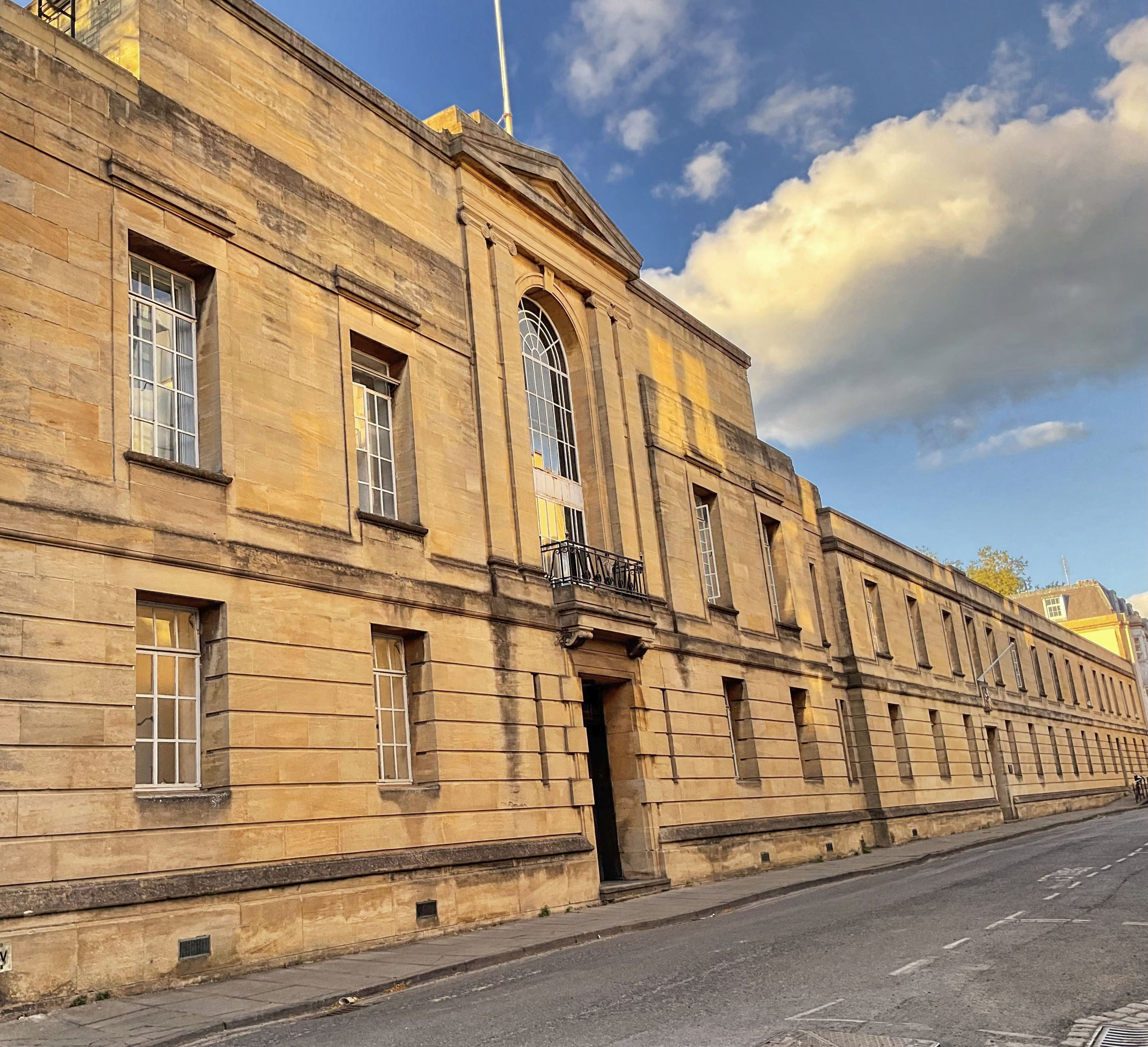
Regent's Park College (Pusey Street)

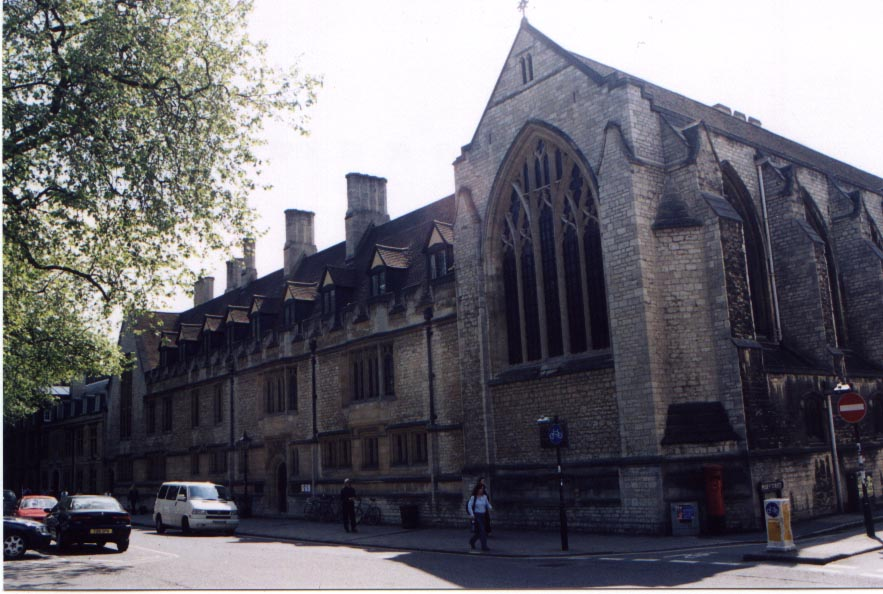
Pusey House Chapel, on the corner of Pusey Street and St Giles'.

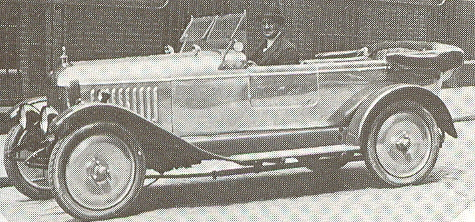
The MG 14/28 car, manufactured in Alfred Lane (now Pusey Lane off Pusey Street) from 1924 to 1925.

Pusey Street links the wide thoroughfare of St Giles' Street (opposite St John's College) to the east with St John Street to the west in the St John Street area of central Oxford, England. Formerly called Alfred Street, it was renamed in honour of Edward Bouverie Pusey in 1926. The renaming also avoided confusion with another Alfred Street to the south.

The street is about 150 yards long and is one-way eastbound for most of its length.

The street is bordered by two educational establishments of Oxford University. On the north side of the street is the Permanent Private Hall of Regent's Park College. This includes a large white building on the corner with St Giles' called Wheeler Robinson House, the ground floor of which is occupied by an Oxfam bookshop. To the south are St Cross College and Pusey House, founded in 1884. Pusey House Chapel is on the corner with St Giles'.

Pusey Lane, off Pusey Street, was renamed from Alfred Lane at the same time as Pusey Street was renamed. MG Cars of Morris Motors manufactured the MG 14/28 car here from 1924 until the move to larger premises in Bainton Road, North Oxford, in September 1925.
