= Russell Mawby =

American academic and philanthropist (1928–2017)

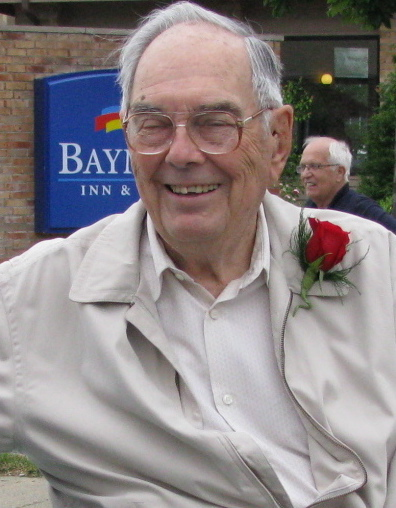
Mawby in 2011

Russell G. Mawby (February 23, 1928 – October 20, 2017) was an American academic and philanthropist who was chairman emeritus of the W.K. Kellogg Foundation. He led the W.K. Kellogg Foundation for 25 years, during which he was credited for creativity in programming by providing opportunities for youth and leadership in the field.

== Early life and philanthropy ==
Mawby was born in Kent County, Michigan in 1928 and grew up on a fruit farm.

== Education and career ==
Mawby attended Michigan State University and graduated with a baccalaureate degree in horticulture and was a member of Alpha Gamma Rho fraternity. In 1951 he completed his Master's degree in Agricultural Economics from Purdue University, and in 1959 he received his doctorate, also in Agricultural Economics, from Michigan State University.

He was on the faculties of both institutions once he completed his degrees and later became a professor and assistant director of the Cooperative Extension Service responsible for 4-H Clubs and youth programming throughout Michigan.

In December 1964, upon the completion of his doctorate degree, Mawby joined the staff of the W.K. Kellogg Foundation as director of the Division of Agriculture. In that position, he developed the Michigan Agricultural Leadership Program, which became a model for the national rural leadership movement. Just three years later he was promoted to vice president and in 1970 became the president and chief executive officer.

The Kellogg Foundation became the national leader in providing support and funding for innovative programs in a number of fields including adult continuing education, access to primary health care, and the development of leadership, especially through the Kellogg National Fellowship Program. Additionally, he spearheaded projects throughout the United States of America, Europe, and Latin America. Upon Mawby's retirement in 1995, he was a foundation trustee until 2000 and was an honorary trustee until 2017.

== Leadership positions ==
- Director of the Division of Agriculture- The W.K. Kellogg Foundation, December 1964- August 1967
- Vice President of Programs- The W.K. Kellogg Foundation, January 1966- December 1967
- Vice President- The W.K. Kellogg Foundation, December 1967- May 1970
- President and Chief Executive Officer- The W.K. Kellogg Foundation, May 1970- July 1995
- Chairman Emeritus- The W.K. Kellogg Foundation, August 1995 – October 2017
- Member of the Board of Trustees- The W.K. Kellogg Foundation, December 1967- December 2000
- Honorary Trustee- The W.K. Kellogg Foundation, December 2000- December 2003, January 2007– October 2017

== Dr. Russell G. Mawby Fellowship in Philanthropic Studies ==
In 2007, the Mawby Fellowship was established at the Dorothy A. Johnson Center for Philanthropy at Grand Valley State University (GVSU), located in Grand Rapids, Michigan.

The fellowship is an interdisciplinary project that pairs one GVSU faculty member with two undergraduate students on a research topic focusing on the intersection between any field of academic study and/or the theory and/or practice of philanthropy. This ongoing fellowship program honors Mawby's lifelong devotion to nurturing, mentoring, and opening doors of opportunity for youth worldwide, as well as his quarter century of leadership in the world of philanthropy as the CEO of the W.K. Kellogg Foundation.

== Russell G. Mawby collection ==
In 2007, Mawby made a gift of his personal papers to the Dorothy A. Johnson Center for Philanthropy at Grand Valley. This archive documents the accomplishments of a central leader in the statewide and national philanthropic fields during a pivotal time in their history, beginning with the run-up to the Tax Reform Act of 1969, covering its turbulent aftermath, continuing with the increasing diversification of philanthropy during the 1980s, the massive growth in giving caused by the tech boom of the 1990s and carrying forward to the present day.

The Mawby Collection is the signature holding of the Johnson Center Philanthropy Archives and is available to researchers online and at the Seidman House. Russell G. Mawby finding aid lists in detail the materials in the collection. Speeches and field notes are accessible online in the digital collection.

== Publications ==
Mawby, along with James Richmond, authored a book detailing his life throughout his childhood into his retirement on all of his philanthropic work. Russell G. Mawby: Recollections of a Man Whose Epitaph Would Say 'He Cared' was written in 2006.
