= Syed Nizamuddin Bin Sayed Khassim =

Malaysian writer, essayist and diplomat (born 1989)

Syed Nizamuddin bin Sayed Khassim سيد نظام الدين بن سيد قاسم FinstAM, FRAS
- Born: 1989 (age 36–37); Kuching, Sarawak, Malaysia
- Education: University of Oxford; University of Malaya; Universiti Teknologi MARA
- Occupations: Writer; Columnist; Administrative and Diplomatic Service Officer
- Writing career
- Language: English; Malay
- Subjects: Geopolitics, Current issues
- Notable awards: Khazanah-Oxford Centre for Islamic Studies Merdeka Scholarship Recipient 2022

Syed Nizamuddin bin Sayed Khassim (born 1989) is a Malaysian geopolitical analyst, author and columnist; regularly contributing to the New Straits Times, South China Morning Post and Berita Harian. He is also an Administrative and Diplomatic Officer in the Malaysian Government. He co-founded MyDiplomacy, a Malaysian youth-focused diplomatic initiative.

== Early life and education ==
Syed Nizamuddin was born in Kuching, Sarawak, Malaysia. He pursued higher education at the University of Oxford under the Yayasan Khazanah's Merdeka Scholarship, where he earned a Master of Studies (MSt) in Diplomatic Studies from Kellogg College. He also holds a Master's degree in Public Administration (MPA) from the University of Malaya.

== Career ==
Syed Nizamuddin served the Foreign Ministry for 10 years, and served at the Malaysian Embassy in Paris as the First Secretary, during which he contributed as a columnist with the New Straits Times. He has also contributed extensively to Malaysia’s diplomatic discourse through his articles in publications such as the South China Morning Post, Malaysia's Institute of Diplomacy and Foreign Relation (IDFR)'s Diplomatic Voice and the New Straits Times.

He is known for his writings on Malaysia's geopolitical strategies, particularly its approach to balancing relationships with major global powers like China and the United States. In his articles and commentaries, Syed Nizamuddin advocates for the continuation of Malaysia’s long-standing practice of geopolitical "hedging," emphasizing a balanced foreign policy that sidesteps alignments with either China or the United States.

== Subnational Diplomacy Advocacy ==
Syed Nizamuddin has also been a prominent voice in advocating for the decentralisation diplomacy, particularly for his home state of Sarawak, Malaysia. He has argued that Sarawak is already engaged in various diplomatic initiatives through agencies like Sarawak Energy and the Sarawak Trade and Tourism Office Singapore (STATOS), and thus, should manage its role better in international affairs, similar to subnational entities in other countries such as Quebec, Bavaria, and Flanders. The proposal generated widespread debate amongst policy makers and academia in Sarawak

== MyDiplomacy Initiative ==
In 2019, Syed Nizamuddin co-founded MyDiplomacy, an initiative aimed at empowering Malaysian youth by providing them with opportunities to engage in diplomatic initiatives. This movement focuses on equipping the next generation of diplomats with the necessary skills and experience to thrive in international relations.

== Writing ==
Syed Nizamuddin writes on a broad spectrum of issues, from geopolitics to current affairs and human interests. His view on subnational diplomacy in particular, garnered significant media attention in Sarawak. James Chin, Professor of Asian Studies at the University of Tasmania supports the idea, noting it aligns with practices in countries like Australia and Canada, enabling Sarawak to manage business relations more directly. However, Professor Datuk Jayum Jawan of Universiti Kebangsaan Malaysia argues that the proposal could undermine federalism, as foreign affairs encompass broader issues beyond economic interests, which should remain under federal control.

== Books ==
- "Pantun; Sastera Agung Bangsa Melayu" in Kitab Tamadun Melayu (The Patriots Publisher, 2022)
