= Rewley House =

University building in Oxford, England

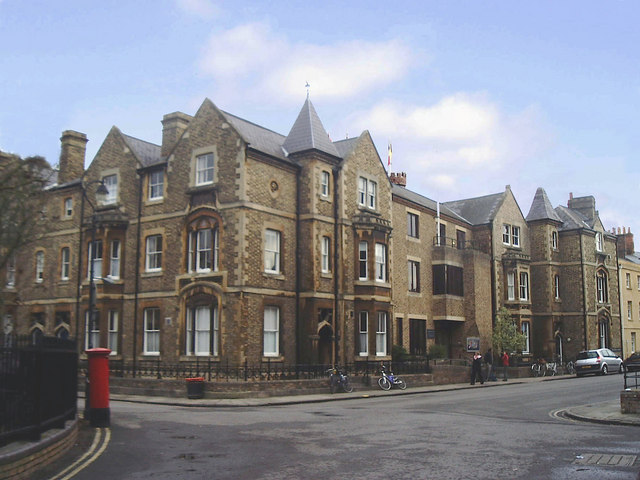
View of Rewley House from Wellington Square.

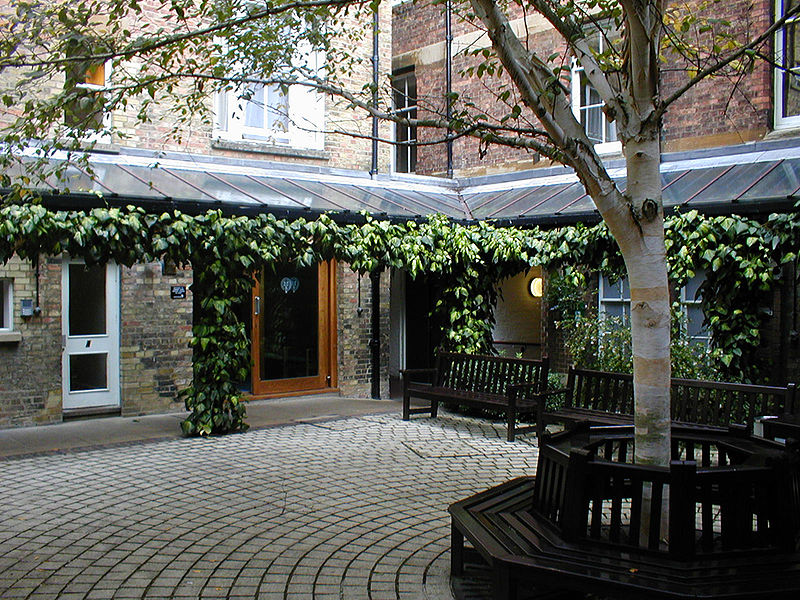
The courtyard inside Rewley House.

Rewley House, located on the corner of Wellington Square and St John Street in the city of Oxford, England, is the primary base of Oxford University's Department for Continuing Education (previously the Department of External Studies).

== History ==
The building known as Rewley House was originally built in 1873 as a convent school, St Anne's Rewley. By 1903, the school had ceased operation, and the building stood dormant until 1927, when it was purchased by the University of Oxford as a headquarters for its adult education activities.

Oxford University was one of the founders of the adult education movement in the United Kingdom in the late 19th century. By the 20th century the university's outreach efforts had grown to such a level as to make a base in Oxford necessary. A report of 1919 recommended "the establishment of a Centre or House for Extra-Mural Students". The old St Anne's became Rewley House, and was the ideal base of operations — particularly since the small hotels in Wellington Square had long been used as accommodation by the university's external students coming to Oxford for residential portions of their courses.

Rewley House in the 1920s included a library, a common room and lecture halls. Further expansion in the 1960s and 1980s added accommodation and dining facilities for students, in addition to more teaching classrooms and a lecture theatre.

Kellogg College, the university's only college dedicated to the needs of part-time adult students, was based in Rewley House until the late 1990s, when it moved to its own grounds nearby on Banbury Road in Oxford.

The name "Rewley" is taken from Rewley Abbey, a 13th-century Cistercian monastery which stood nearby.

The Oxford University Department for Continuing Education offers over 700 courses annually to over 15,000 students, making it one of the largest departments at the university, and a leading provider of part-time adult education worldwide.
