= Society for the Study of Black Religion =

African-American religious scholarly society

The Society for the Study of Black Religion is the oldest scholarly society dedicated to the study of the African-American religious experience. It is dedicated to "scholarly research and discussion about the religious experiences of Blacks."

== History ==
The SSBR was founded in 1970 to support black religious scholars' critical inquiry into the foundations of black theology. The intellectual ferment which led to the group's founding began with Joseph B. Washington's publication of the seminal Black Religion in 1964, and continued with the publication of James H. Cone's Black Theology and Black Power in 1969.

The group chose the name "religion" rather than "theology" to avoid the constraints imposed by the narrower term. Charles Shelby Rooks, who would later become the first African-American head of a traditionally white-led seminary at the Chicago Theological Seminary, took a leading role in the founding and served as the SSBR's first elected president.

== Presidents ==
- Charles Shelby Rooks, 1970–1974
- Lawrence Neale Jones, 1974–1977
- Gayraud Wilmore, 1978–1980
- Charles Shelby Rooks, 1980–1983
- Gayraud Wilmore, 1984–1985
- Charles H. Long, 1986–1989
- Clarence G. Newsome, 1990–1991
- Lillian Ashcraft-Eason, 1996–1999
- Peter J. Paris, 2000–2003
- Katie G. Cannon, 2004–2008
- Lee H. Butler, Jr., 2008–2012
- Emilie Townes, 2012–2016
- Stephen G. Ray, Jr., 2016–present

== Notable members ==
- James H. Cone
- Temba Mafico
- Hugh R. Page, Jr.

== See also ==
- Black theology
