= Centro Pro Unione =

Coordinates: 41°53′56.6″N 12°28′19.9″E

Centro Pro Unione is a ministry of the Franciscan Friars of the Atonement, a Franciscan Anglican community founded in 1898 by Fr. Paul Wattson, SA, Servant of God, and Mother Lurana White, SA, and welcomed into full communion with the Church of Rome in 1909 by St. Pius X. Among the charisms of the Congregation of the Atonement is the promotion of unity among all Christians. The Centro Pro Unione fulfills this particular vocation.

== History ==
The roots of the Centro go back at least to 1948, when the friars began collaborating with the ecumenical magazine “Unitas”, founded by the Jesuit P. Carlo Boyer and based in the convent of St. Brigida in p.zza Farnese in Rome. Between 1950 and 1960 a collaboration was developed with the Ladies of Bethany and the Foyer Unitas, for the welcoming of Orthodox and Protestant visitors to Rome. The Prayer Association “Pro Unione” (Lega di preghiera), conceived by Fr. Paul Wattson, was formed and directed by Fr. Celestine Leahy. The League provided the Italian translation, the printing and the dissemination of the texts for the “Week of Prayer for the Christian Unity”, which is celebrated every year from 18 to 25 January in the Northern hemisphere. In 1962, Princess Orietta Doria Pamphilj and her husband, Commander Frank Pogson, invited Foyer Unitas, the International Association Unitas and the League of Prayer “Pro Unione” to move to Pamphilj Palace in p.zza Navona. From that moment on, the noble dwelling became a center of ecumenical meeting, especially in the years of the Second Vatican Council. In 1968 the Friars ceased the English edition of the magazine “Unitas” and founded the Centro Pro Unione, which became a place of meeting, study, research and ecumenical dialogue and formation. The Centre began to coordinate, with other Italian ecumenical centers, the Italian edition of the “Week of Prayer for the Christian Unity”. In 1969 the Centro was officially inaugurated by the card. Johannes Willebrands. The Centro Pro Unione, to date, has a library specializing in the field of ecumenism, continues its work to promote ecumenical dialogue, through meetings and conferences and by maintaining an up-to-date documentation on the official theological dialogue, and continues to coordinate and disseminate the material useful for the yearly celebration of the “Week of Prayer for Christian Unity”.
