= Hugh R. Page =

Associate professor at Notre Dame

The Reverend Hugh R. Page
- Born: Hugh Rowland Page Jr. 1956 (age 69–70)

Ecclesiastical career
- Religion: Christianity (Anglican)
- Church: Episcopal Church (United States)
- Ordained: 1980 (deacon); bef. 1985 (priest)

Academic background
- Education: Hampton University; Harvard University; General Theological Seminary
- Thesis: The Astral Revolt (1990)

Academic work
- Discipline: Theology
- Sub-discipline: Africana religious studies; biblical scholarship
- Institutions: University of Notre Dame

Hugh Rowland Page Jr. (born 1956) is professor of Africana studies and theology at the University of Notre Dame. He has previously chaired the Africana studies department. He also served as dean of the First Year of Studies, and as vice-president and associate provost for undergraduate affairs. He is a scholar of esotericism in African-American religious experience.

Page holds a Bachelor of Arts degree from Hampton University and Master of Arts and Doctor of Philosophy degrees in Near Eastern languages and civilizations from Harvard University. His dissertation at Harvard was on The Astral Revolt: A Study of Its Reflexes in Canaanite and Hebrew Literature. In addition to these academic qualifications, Page is also an Episcopal priest, and holds Master of Divinity and Master of Sacred Theology from the General Theological Seminary.

Page was elected to membership in the Society for the Study of Black Religion in 2002. He also serves on the Board of Trustees of Stonehill College.

Page served as the general editor for the Africana Bible, published in 2009. The Africana Bible was the "first commentary to gather voices from the Continent and the Diaspora into a single volume covering the entire Hebrew Bible."

== Selected bibliography ==
=== Books ===
- Page, Hugh R. (1996). Exploring New Paradigms in Biblical and Cognate Studies. Lewiston, New York: Mellen Biblical Press. ISBN 0773424075.
- Page, Hugh R. (1997). The Myth of Cosmic Rebellion: A Study of its Reflexes in Ugaritic and Biblical Literature. Brill. ISBN 9004105638.
- Page, Hugh R. (1997). Waves, Clouds, and Flames-Impressions from Journeys Past and Present. Quiet Fire Press. ISBN 0965028305.
- Page, Hugh R. (2006). Exodus. Bible Reading Fellowship. ISBN 1841010669.
- Page, Hugh R. (2013). Israel's Poetry of Resistance. Minneapolis: Fortress Press. ISBN 9780800663346.
- Hugh R. Page, ed. (2009). The Africana Bible. Minneapolis: Fortress Press. ISBN 978-0800621254.
