= Department for Continuing Education, University of Oxford =

Oxford University department

Coordinates: 51.7572°N 1.2621°W

Department for Continuing Education
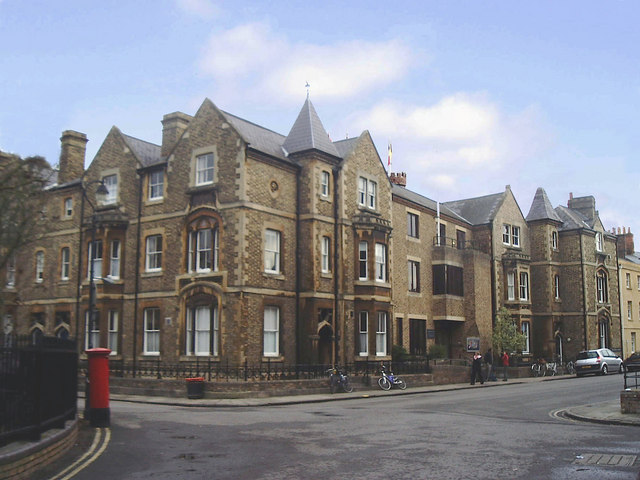
- Established: 1878
- Affiliations: University of Oxford
- Director: Dr Alison MacDonald (Interim)
- Academic staff: 90
- Students: c. 15,000 enrollees per year
- Location: Oxford, England
- Website: www.lifelong-learning.ox.ac.uk

The Department for Continuing Education is a constituent department of the University of Oxford in Oxford, England, United Kingdom.

It provides a range of courses and qualifications under the Oxford Lifelong Learning brand name, mainly for part-time and mature students, as well overseeing the university's Language Centre and foundation year programmes.

== Names ==
Prior to acquiring its current name in 2025, the institution was also known as:

- 1878–1892: University of Oxford Standing Committee of the Delegacy of Local Examinations;
- 1892–1924: University of Oxford Delegacy for the Extension of Teaching Beyond the Limits of the University;
- 1924–1970: University of Oxford Delegacy of Extra-Mural Studies;
- 1971–1990: University of Oxford Department for External Studies;
- 1990–present: University of Oxford Department for Continuing Education
  - June 2025: added the brand name "Oxford Lifelong Learning"

== History ==
The 19th century saw an awakening social awareness to the needs of working-class people generally, and Oxford University signalled an educational responsibility to the general community by sending lecturers into towns and cities across Victorian England, bringing university education to a diverse adult audience. The University of Oxford was one of the founders, in the late 19th century, of the so-called 'extension' movement, wherein universities began to offer educational opportunities to adult learners outside their traditional student base. The University of Oxford Standing Committee of the Delegacy of Local Examinations was established in 1878. The first of the early "Oxford Extension Lectures" was delivered at the King Edward VI School in Birmingham, in September 1878 by the Reverend Arthur Johnson. By 1893, Oxford University Extension Centres were bringing adult education to much of England and a few cities in Wales.

In 1927 the university purchased Rewley House on Wellington Square in Oxford as the permanent base of what was then known as the "University of Oxford Delegacy for Extra-Mural Studies", and which later was renamed as the Oxford University Department for Continuing Education.

In August 2024, the university's Language Centre was merged into the department.

In June 2025, the Department for Continuing Education adopted "Oxford Lifelong Learning" as the brand name for the department's courses.

== See also ==
- University of Cambridge Professional and Continuing Education
