= The Importance of Wild-Animal Suffering =

2009 essay by Brian Tomasik

- Author: Brian Tomasik (originally as Alan Dawrst)
- Language: English
- Subject: Wild animal suffering; wild animal ethics
- Genre: Essay
- Published: July 2009
- Published in: Essays on Reducing Suffering
- Text: The Importance of Wild-Animal Suffering at the Center on Long-Term Risk

"The Importance of Wild-Animal Suffering" is a 2009 essay by American writer Brian Tomasik arguing that suffering among wild animals warrants greater ethical consideration. Originally self-published under the pseudonym Alan Dawrst on Tomasik's website Essays on Reducing Suffering, a revised version appeared in the journal Relations. Beyond Anthropocentrism in 2015. The essay was subsequently republished and translated, including into French in Les Cahiers antispécistes.

Tomasik argues that wild animals greatly outnumber animals under direct human control and that many experience suffering from natural causes, including predation, disease, parasitism, hunger, and exposure to adverse weather. He examines reproductive strategies, population dynamics, and uncertainty about animal sentience to argue that suffering may exceed happiness in nature. He advocates further research into wild animal welfare and cautions that future technologies could increase suffering by creating new ecosystems or sentient artificial beings.

== Background ==
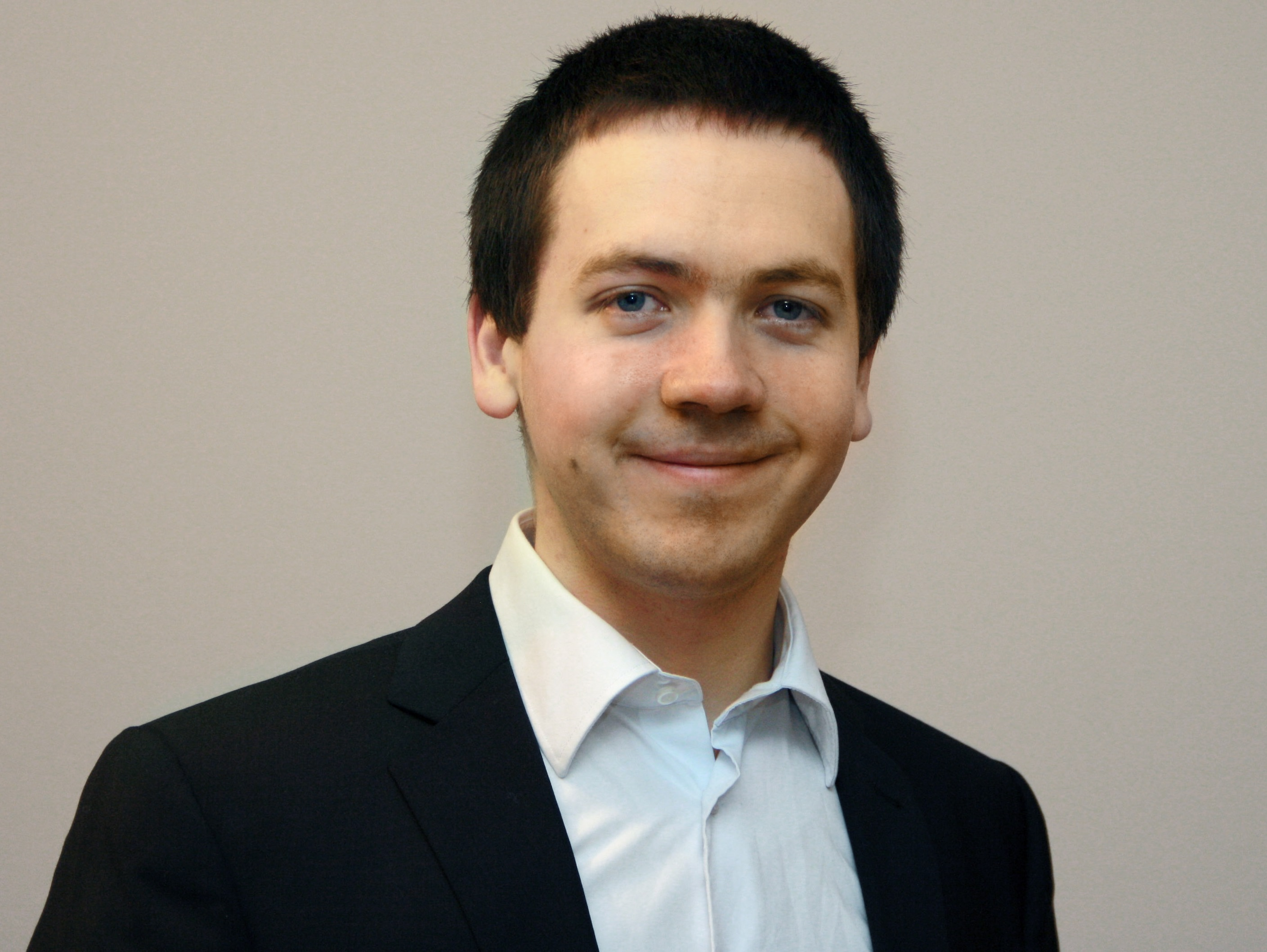
Tomasik in 2014

In an autobiographical essay published in 2012, Tomasik described his interest in wild animal suffering as developing from his engagement with animal ethics and environmentalism in the mid-2000s. He wrote that reading essays by Peter Singer in 2005 led him to take animal suffering more seriously and consider whether ethical concerns about human treatment of animals should also extend to suffering caused by natural processes.

Tomasik identified Bernard E. Rollin's Animal Rights & Human Morality and research on pain in invertebrates as influences on his concern that insects and other invertebrates might be sentient. He subsequently questioned whether wild animals generally experience more happiness than suffering. Other influences he identified included Gaverick Matheny and Kai Chan's work on habitat change and animal welfare, Yew-Kwang Ng's proposal for welfare biology, writings in environmental ethics, and David Pearce's The Hedonistic Imperative. Tomasik also described corresponding with Oscar Horta in 2008, which led to further discussions of wild animal suffering.

== Publication history ==
Tomasik first published the essay in July 2009 under the pseudonym Alan Dawrst on his website Essays on Reducing Suffering. A revised version appeared under his name in the November 2015 issue of Relations. Beyond Anthropocentrism, devoted to wild animal suffering and intervention in nature.

The Center on Long-Term Risk subsequently republished the essay on its website, where it is listed as first written in July 2009 and last revised on 24 May 2020. The website provides links to the journal version and translations into Spanish, Portuguese, German, and French.

In April 2018, a French translation by Vincent Bozzolan appeared in issue 40 of Les Cahiers antispécistes under the title "L'importance de la souffrance des animaux sauvages". The publication identified the 2015 journal article as the text being translated.

== Summary ==
Tomasik argues that wild animals are far more numerous than animals raised for food, used in laboratories, or kept as companions, and that the scale of suffering in nature warrants ethical consideration. He surveys sources of suffering, including predation, chronic fear of predators, disease, parasitism, hunger, cold, injury, and accidents. He contends that these experiences are often overlooked in discussions of animal welfare, which tend to concentrate on harms caused directly by humans.

A central part of the essay concerns population dynamics and juvenile mortality. Tomasik observes that many species produce large numbers of offspring, only a small proportion of which survive to reproductive maturity. He argues that these patterns, particularly among small animals with short lifespans, provide grounds for questioning whether happiness generally outweighs suffering in nature. He also considers uncertainty about when animals become sentient, including whether individuals that die shortly after birth or hatching can experience suffering. Tomasik acknowledges objections to the claim that many wild animal lives may contain more suffering than happiness.

The essay considers whether humans should intervene to reduce suffering caused by natural processes. Tomasik argues that human activities already alter ecosystems, making it necessary to assess the welfare consequences of different forms of intervention rather than treating non-interference as the default. However, he cautions that ecological complexity and the possibility of unintended consequences make extensive interventions difficult to evaluate. He advocates research into animal sentience, the frequency and intensity of positive and negative experiences, and the effects of environmental changes on welfare.

Tomasik also examines the possible effects of future technologies. He expresses concern that terraforming, directed panspermia, and sufficiently complex computer simulations could create additional populations of sentient beings exposed to suffering. He argues that animal advocates should encourage research and wider consideration of wild animal suffering, particularly to influence future decisions about technologies that could alter or create ecosystems.

== Reception and discussion ==
In February 2016, Faunalytics, an animal advocacy research organization, published a summary of the essay by Karol Orzechowski. The summary discussed Tomasik's arguments about the number of wild animals, high juvenile mortality, and the possibility that suffering exceeds happiness in nature. It also noted his reservations about immediate large-scale intervention, particularly the risks posed by insufficient ecological knowledge and technological capabilities.

A 2016 research plan published by the Foundational Research Institute, now the Center on Long-Term Risk, described the essay as "seminal" and stated that it had encouraged further work on wild animal suffering.

In his 2016 article "Should the Lion Eat Straw Like the Ox? Animal Ethics and the Predation Problem", philosopher Jozef Keulartz discussed Tomasik's essay alongside work by Yew-Kwang Ng and Oscar Horta challenging the assumption that natural ecological conditions generally benefit individual animals. Keulartz examined Tomasik's concern that the animal rights movement might encourage wilderness preservation and human non-interference, which Tomasik argued could perpetuate wild animal suffering.

The original version of the essay has been cited in academic discussions of animal ethics and harms in nature, including by Oscar Horta (2010), Sue Donaldson and Will Kymlicka (2013), and Beril Idemen Sozmen (2013).

The 2015 journal version has been cited in subsequent literature on wild animal suffering and welfare biology, including by Alasdair Cochrane in Sentientist Politics (2018), Kyle Johannsen in Wild Animal Ethics (2020), and Catia Faria in Animal Ethics in the Wild (2022).

== See also ==
- Animal consciousness
- Ethics of uncertain sentience
- The Meat Eaters
- Moral circle expansion
- Pain in animals
- Predation problem
- Risk of astronomical suffering
- Suffering-focused ethics
