= Brian Tomasik =

American researcher, ethicist, and essayist

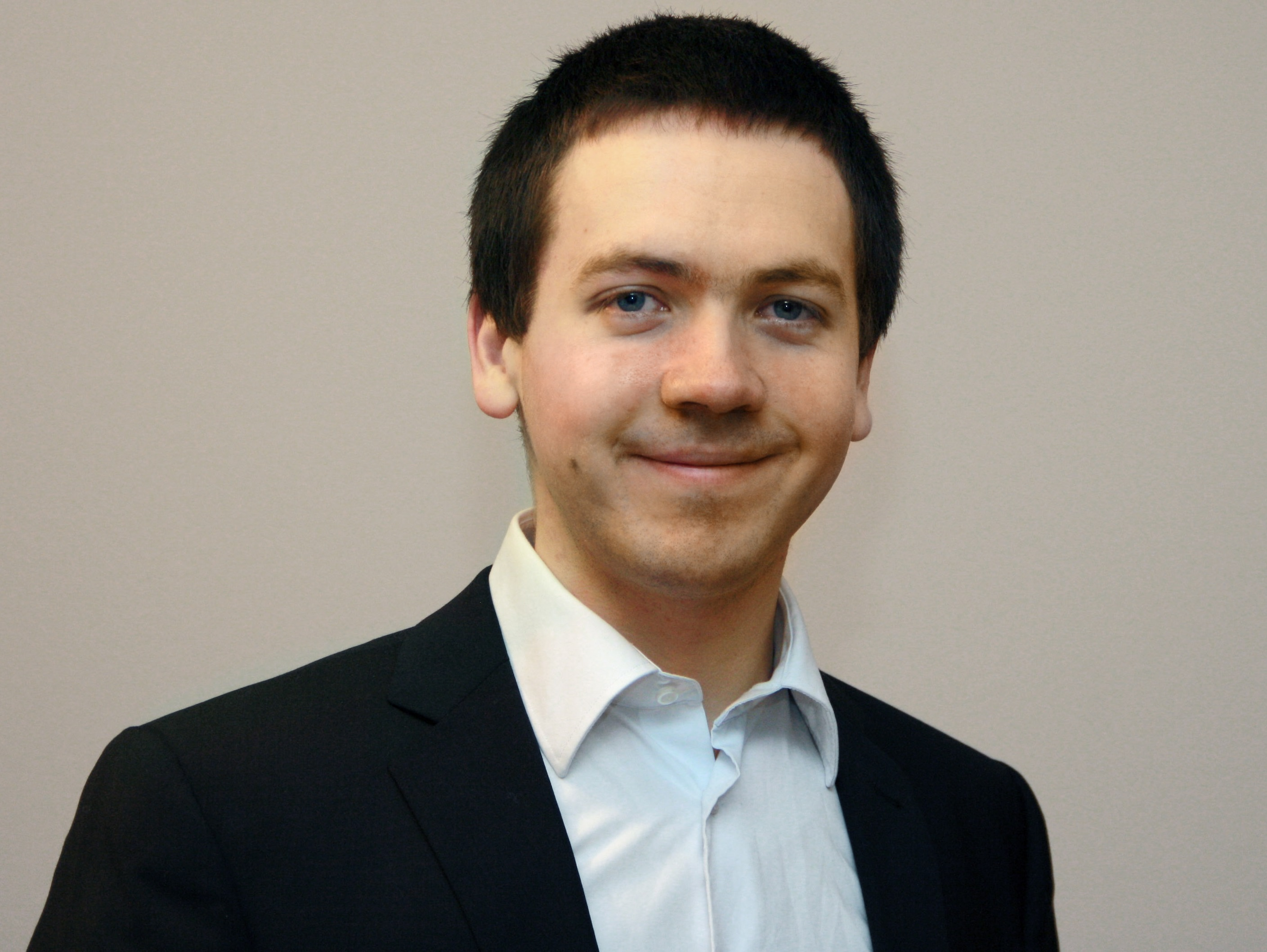
- Tomasik in 2014
- Other name: Alan Dawrst (former pseudonym)
- Citizenship: American
- Education: Swarthmore College (B.A. in computer science, 2009)
- Occupations: Researcher; ethicist; essayist
- Organizations: Center on Long-Term Risk (co-founder and advisor); Center for Reducing Suffering (advisor)
- Known for: Work on wild animal suffering, suffering-focused ethics, and the ethics of artificial intelligence
- Notable work: Essays on Reducing Suffering (2006–present); "The Importance of Wild-Animal Suffering" (2009)
- Website: Personal website; Essays on Reducing Suffering

Brian Tomasik (/tʌˈmɑːsɪk/ tuh-MAH-sick) is an American researcher, ethicist, and essayist whose work concerns suffering-focused ethics, wild animal suffering, and the moral status of non-human animals and artificial minds. He is the author of Essays on Reducing Suffering and the 2009 essay "The Importance of Wild-Animal Suffering". He has also written about invertebrate sentience, artificial consciousness, and the risk of astronomical suffering.

Tomasik co-founded the Center on Long-Term Risk, formerly the Foundational Research Institute, and has contributed to research on animal welfare assessment. His arguments about wild animal suffering and interventions in nature have been discussed in academic work on animal ethics and environmental ethics.

== Education and career ==
Tomasik attended Guilderland Central High School in Guilderland, New York, graduating in 2005. He studied computer science at Swarthmore College, with minors in mathematics and statistics, and received a B.A. in 2009. After graduating, he worked at Microsoft, applying statistics and machine learning to search ranking at Bing.

Tomasik has described adopting a broadly utilitarian outlook by 2005, influenced partly by Peter Singer and Ralph Nader. He has also identified Singer, Bernard Rollin, Yew-Kwang Ng, and David Pearce as influences on his interest in wild animal suffering, particularly the suffering of insects and other invertebrates.

While working in the technology sector, Tomasik became involved in the strategy later known as earning to give. In a 2012 interview, he described donating a substantial proportion of his income to charitable causes. In 2013, he left Microsoft to concentrate on research into reducing suffering and co-founded the Center on Long-Term Risk, initially known as the Foundational Research Institute. From 2012 to 2015, he served on the board of Animal Charity Evaluators.

== Essays on Reducing Suffering ==
Tomasik began collecting philosophical writings in 2005 and 2006. After corresponding with David Pearce in 2006, he created a website to publish them, initially titled Utilitarian Essays and later renamed Essays on Reducing Suffering.

He initially published under the pseudonym Alan Dawrst.

The website contains essays on ethics, consciousness, artificial intelligence, and animal suffering, as well as interviews and donation recommendations. Tomasik has maintained the website using different publishing systems, including WordPress and a manually maintained format.

== Views ==
=== Moral anti-realism and moral progress ===
Tomasik identifies as a moral anti-realist. He argues that moral progress can be understood relative to people's values without assuming the existence of objective moral truths. In his view, moral commitments derive their importance from the desires and concerns of those who hold them.

He has suggested that competing moral outlooks might eventually converge through the emergence of a dominant decision-making system, or "singleton", a concept discussed by Nick Bostrom. Tomasik distinguishes this possibility from convergence towards objective moral truth, arguing that the values of such a system would instead reflect the outcome of competition between groups with different objectives.

=== Consent-based negative utilitarianism ===
Tomasik has defended giving priority to the prevention of suffering over the creation of happiness. In particular, he argues that sufficiently severe suffering cannot necessarily be morally compensated for by positive experiences. He has examined this position through a proposed form of negative utilitarianism that gives particular weight to consent.

In what he calls "consent-based negative utilitarianism", Tomasik proposes that the moral significance of suffering can be assessed by considering whether an individual experiencing it would agree to continue in exchange for future benefits. Under this approach, suffering that an individual would consent to endure could be outweighed by subsequent happiness, whereas suffering that the individual would reject regardless of future benefits would receive overriding moral priority.

Tomasik presents consent as one possible way to determine a threshold beyond which suffering cannot be compensated. He acknowledges difficulties with this approach, including how to evaluate consent in beings unable to communicate their preferences and how to account for conflicting preferences within an individual. He contrasts it with a hypothetical "consent-based positive utilitarianism", while stating that his preference for preventing suffering ultimately reflects his moral intuitions.

He also questions whether creating additional happy beings has independent moral value. Tomasik argues that nonexistence is not a deprivation for beings who never exist and that preventing severe suffering is more urgent than creating new positive experiences. He acknowledges that others may assign greater moral importance to happiness and that his own position depends on subjective moral judgements.

=== Evidence-based ethical decision-making ===
Tomasik advocates considering evidence, cost-effectiveness, and long-term consequences when deciding how to reduce suffering. He has argued that moral intuitions and ideological commitments can lead people to favour interventions that are less effective than alternatives. His approach includes comparing the scale of different problems and considering whether efforts to address them are neglected or tractable.

=== Wild animal suffering ===
Tomasik has argued that wild animal suffering deserves greater attention because of the large number of animals affected. In a 2012 interview, he described it as "the most important current issue due to its sheer scale", arguing that suffering among wild animals could greatly exceed suffering caused directly by humans.

His argument gives particular attention to invertebrates, many of which produce large numbers of offspring that die before reaching maturity. Tomasik maintains that starvation, disease, parasitism, predation, and other natural causes may subject enormous numbers of animals to suffering. The extent of this suffering depends partly on whether these animals are sentient and on the balance of positive and negative experiences during their lives.

==== Interventions to reduce wild animal suffering ====
Tomasik has considered several possible approaches to reducing wild animal suffering, including research, changes to land use, and long-term modifications to wildlife populations. He has argued that, if wild animal lives contain more suffering than positive experiences, reducing the number of animals born could decrease total suffering. This reasoning has led him to consider habitat destruction as a possible means of reducing future suffering.

Among the measures he has suggested is replacing grass lawns with gravel to reduce the populations of invertebrates supported by those environments. He has also discussed proposals by David Pearce to use gene drives to alter wild animals' pain sensitivity or other biological characteristics. Tomasik has expressed concern that widespread genetic changes could disrupt ecological relationships and cause species extinctions. He maintains that biodiversity and ecosystem stability have instrumental value insofar as they contribute to the welfare of sentient beings, rather than being valuable independently of those effects.

Tomasik has also discussed the possibility of reducing wild invertebrate populations through sterilization or other means of limiting reproduction.

==== Future risks of replicating wild animal suffering ====
Tomasik has argued that technologies capable of creating new ecosystems or simulated minds could reproduce or increase suffering on a large scale. He identifies terraforming and directed panspermia as possible means by which humans could introduce life to other planets, potentially creating ecosystems in which sentient organisms experience suffering. He has also raised concerns that sufficiently complex computer simulations might contain artificial minds capable of suffering.

He has additionally questioned whether some forms of wilderness preservation might increase suffering by maintaining or expanding populations of animals whose lives are, in his view, likely to contain more suffering than enjoyment. Tomasik has expressed concern that parts of the animal rights movement could encourage such policies through opposition to human intervention in nature.

=== Animal welfare assessment ===
Tomasik co-authored a study with Laura Scherer, Oscar Rueda, and Stephan Pfister proposing a framework for incorporating animal welfare into life cycle sustainability assessment. Published online in 2017 and in a 2018 issue of The International Journal of Life Cycle Assessment, the study proposed three indicators based on animals' quality of life, lifespan, and the number of animals affected per unit of food produced. One indicator also incorporated an adjustment for differences in cognitive capacities.

The authors applied the indicators to eight animal-derived food products, including meat, dairy, eggs, fish, shrimp, and insects. Under their assumptions, insect-based foods produced the greatest estimated loss of animal welfare across all three indicators, principally because large numbers of insects were required to produce a given quantity of food. The authors acknowledged that their welfare measures were simplified and that the results depended on assumptions about animal sentience and the welfare effects of production practices.

=== Moral scope and animal ethics ===
Tomasik rejects speciesism, arguing that moral consideration should depend on ethically relevant characteristics rather than species membership. He regards sentience and cognitive capacities as relevant to moral decisions, while allowing that differences in communication, cognition, and social relationships can sometimes justify different treatment.

He has expressed sympathy for an ethical approach resembling Robert Nozick's formulation of "utilitarianism for animals, Kantianism for people". Tomasik argues that consequentialist considerations are relevant to reducing animal suffering, while maintaining that deontological norms, including honesty, nonviolence, and respect for rights, can have important practical benefits for cooperation and trust among humans.

==== Ethical concerns about eating insects ====
Tomasik has argued against entomophagy, the practice of eating insects, because of the possibility that insects experience suffering. He acknowledges that insect farming may offer environmental benefits but argues that the large numbers of animals raised and killed could make its welfare implications substantial if insects are sentient.

Given uncertainty about insect consciousness, Tomasik advocates precaution. He has supported the development of welfare standards for insect farming, including less harmful slaughter methods, while arguing that avoiding insect-based foods is preferable.

==== Ethical concerns about eating bivalves ====
Tomasik has also questioned the ethics of consuming mussels, oysters, and other bivalves. He has cited their responses to environmental stimuli and evidence involving opioid systems as possible indicators of rudimentary sentience, while acknowledging that their capacity for suffering remains uncertain. He has stated that he avoids eating bivalves partly because a single meal may require killing numerous individuals and because some are boiled alive. He has also described dairy consumption as ethically preferable to eating bivalves under his own assumptions about animal sentience and suffering.

=== Ethics of artificial intelligence ===
Tomasik has written about the possible moral status of artificial minds, including systems developed through reinforcement learning. He argues that the processes used by some artificial agents resemble aspects of learning in biological animals and that such similarities may be relevant to decisions about moral consideration.

==== Artificial suffering and s-risks ====
Tomasik has examined the possibility that advanced artificial intelligence and computer simulations could produce large amounts of suffering. He argues that artificial systems might eventually include processes analogous to suffering in biological organisms, and that the replication of such systems could produce risks of astronomical suffering, or "s-risks". He has advocated considering these risks in the development and governance of advanced artificial intelligence.

==== Moral consideration of video game characters ====
In a 2014 interview with Vox, Tomasik discussed whether non-player characters (NPCs) in video games might deserve moral consideration. He suggested that simple characters, such as Goombas in Super Mario Bros., probably had negligible moral significance, while more complex characters exhibiting goal-directed behavior might warrant some consideration. He compared such characters with artificial reinforcement-learning agents and questioned whether reward-seeking and punishment-avoidance processes could have moral relevance.

Tomasik argued that the moral significance of individual NPCs was likely to be extremely small, but that the cumulative effects of large numbers of simulated interactions might eventually matter. In a 2021 interview with Wired, he again discussed the possibility that increasingly complex video game characters could raise ethical questions about artificial suffering.

=== Consciousness ===
Tomasik has defended an eliminativist approach to consciousness. He rejects the existence of qualia as ontologically distinct properties and describes himself as a type-A physicalist, using terminology developed by David Chalmers. In Tomasik's account, consciousness is a high-level concept that humans attribute to physical systems rather than a separate property whose existence can be established independently of those systems.

He compares consciousness with concepts such as justice, which he regards as meaningful despite uncertainty about their boundaries. Tomasik argues that questions about whether particular systems should receive moral consideration cannot be settled solely by identifying an objective property of consciousness. He nevertheless considers research in neuroscience and computer science useful for understanding the similarities and differences between biological and artificial minds.

== Reception and criticism ==
=== Wild animal suffering ===
Tomasik's writings have contributed to discussions of wild animal suffering within effective altruism and animal ethics. He corresponded with other writers on the subject, including Oscar Horta, and helped establish an online discussion group that later became known as "Reducing wild-animal suffering".

His essay "The Importance of Wild-Animal Suffering", first written in 2009, was subsequently published by the Center on Long-Term Risk and in the journal Relations. Beyond Anthropocentrism in 2015. A 2016 research plan published by the Foundational Research Institute identified the essay as an early contribution to its work on wild animal suffering and possible interventions.

Tomasik's essay "How Many Wild Animals Are There?", first written in 2009, has also been cited in discussions of the number of animals living in the wild and the ethical implications of their possible suffering.

Peter Singer has credited Tomasik, Horta, and Catia Faria with contributing to the development of wild animal suffering as a subject within animal ethics. In a 2023 interview, Singer said that their work had influenced his decision to address the issue in Animal Liberation Now, after he had previously considered it too speculative to include. Singer also cited Tomasik and Horta in The Most Good You Can Do (2015).

=== Insect welfare and human exceptionalism ===
In a 2014 article for National Review, Wesley J. Smith criticized Tomasik's concern for insects as an example of rejecting human exceptionalism. Smith questioned the implications of extending moral consideration to insects, particularly when their possible interests were weighed against human concerns. He also objected to proposals for reducing insect populations to prevent suffering, arguing that they assigned excessive moral weight to uncertain insect sentience.

=== Habitat destruction ===
Philosopher Kyle Johannsen has criticized Tomasik's argument that intentionally destroying habitats could be justified if it prevented the existence of wild animals whose lives would contain more suffering than enjoyment. Johannsen argues that this reasoning gives insufficient weight to moral constraints against directly harming animals. From a moderate deontological perspective, he maintains that negative duties, such as duties not to kill or displace animals, are more stringent than positive duties to prevent suffering. Johannsen therefore rejects intentional habitat destruction while defending cautious interventions intended to improve wild animal welfare.

In The Oxford Handbook of Consequentialism, philosophers Tyler M. John and Jeff Sebo discuss Tomasik's position under the label "Logic of the Logger". They examine whether consequentialism could justify reducing wild animal populations when their lives are expected to contain more suffering than enjoyment. John and Sebo argue that the conclusion depends on unresolved empirical and ethical questions, including the welfare of wild animals, population ethics, and the consequences of habitat destruction. They also consider the effects such policies could have on human attitudes towards animals. Although they do not rule out the possibility that habitat reduction could be justified under some circumstances, they argue that the available evidence does not support it at present and favour interventions that respect animals' lives and autonomy.

== Publications ==
- ——; Sutherland, Dougal (2008). "An Efficient Python Module for Lexical Distributional Similarity" (PDF). Swarthmore College. Department of Computer Science.
- Golub, Stephen S.; —— (May 15, 2008). Measures of International Transport Cost for OECD Countries (Report). OECD Economics Department Working Papers. doi:10.1787/241707325051.
- —— (2009). "A Minimum Description Length Approach to Multitask Feature Selection". arXiv:0906.0052 [cs.LG].
- Dhillon, Paramveer S.; ——; Foster, Dean; Ungar, Lyle (2009). "Multi-task Feature Selection Using the Multiple Inclusion Criterion (MIC)". In Buntine, Wray; Grobelnik, Marko; Mladenić, Dunja; Shawe-Taylor, John (eds.). Machine Learning and Knowledge Discovery in Databases. Lecture Notes in Computer Science. Vol. 5781. Berlin, Heidelberg: Springer. pp. 276–289. doi:10.1007/978-3-642-04180-8_35. ISBN 978-3-642-04180-8.
- ——; Kim, Joon Hee; Ladlow, Margaret; Augat, Malcolm; Tingle, Derek; Wicentowski, Richard; Turnbull, Douglas (2009). Using Regression to Combine Data Sources for Semantic Music Discovery (PDF). 10th International Society for Music Information Retrieval Conference (ISMIR 2009).
- ——; Thiha, Phyo; Turnbull, Douglas (July 19, 2009). "Tagging products using image classification" (PDF). Proceedings of the 32nd international ACM SIGIR conference on Research and development in information retrieval. SIGIR '09. New York, NY, USA: Association for Computing Machinery. pp. 792–793. doi:10.1145/1571941.1572131. ISBN 978-1-60558-483-6.
- —— (2014). "Do Artificial Reinforcement-Learning Agents Matter Morally?". arXiv:1410.8233 [cs.AI].
- —— (2015). "The Importance of Wild-Animal Suffering". Relations. Beyond Anthropocentrism. 3 (2) 1: 133–152. doi:10.7358/rela-2015-002-toma.
- —— (2016). "Insects Should Not Be a Part of People's Diets". In Espejo, Roman (ed.). What Should We Eat?. New York, NY: Greenhaven Publishing. p. 82. ISBN 978-0-7377-7390-3.
- Scherer, Laura; ——; Rueda, Oscar; Pfister, Stephan (2018). "Framework for integrating animal welfare into life cycle sustainability assessment". The International Journal of Life Cycle Assessment. 23 (7): 1476–1490. Bibcode:2018IJLCA..23.1476S. doi:10.1007/s11367-017-1420-x. ISSN 0948-3349. PMC 6435210. PMID 30996531.
- —— (August 7, 2019) [2009]. "How Many Wild Animals Are There?". Essays on Reducing Suffering.

== See also ==
- Ethics of uncertain sentience
- Relationship between animal ethics and environmental ethics
