= Jeff McMahan (philosopher) =

American moral philosopher (born 1954)

- Born: Jefferson Allen McMahan; August 30, 1954 (age 72)

Education
- Education: University of the South; Corpus Christi College, Oxford; St. John's College, Cambridge
- Thesis: Problems of Population Theory (1986)
- Doctoral advisor: Jonathan Glover, Derek Parfit, Bernard Williams

Philosophical work
- Era: Contemporary philosophy
- Region: Western philosophy
- School: Analytic
- Institutions: St. John's College, Cambridge; University of Illinois, Urbana-Champaign; Rutgers University; University of Oxford
- Main interests: Normative and applied ethics
- Notable ideas: The ethics of intensive animal farming, the ethics of wild animal suffering, the ethics of killing in war, the ethics of nuclear weapons

Jefferson Allen McMahan (/məkˈmɑːn/ mək-MAHN; born August 30, 1954) is an American moral philosopher. He was Sekyra and White's Professor of Moral Philosophy at the University of Oxford from 2014 to 2025.

== Education and career ==
In 1976, McMahan completed a B.A. degree in English literature at the University of the South (Sewanee). In 1978, he got a second B.A., in philosophy, politics, and economics, then did graduate work in philosophy at Corpus Christi College, Oxford as a Rhodes Scholar. In 1983, he earned his M.A. at the University of Oxford. He was offered a research studentship at St John's College, Cambridge. He studied first under Jonathan Glover and Derek Parfit at the University of Oxford and was later supervised by Bernard Williams at the University of Cambridge, where he was a research fellow of St John's College from 1983 to 1986. He received his doctorate in 1986 from the University of Cambridge. His thesis title was Problems of Population Theory.

He taught at the University of Illinois, Urbana-Champaign from 1986 to 2003 and at Rutgers University from 2003 to 2014.

He was elected a Fellow of the American Academy of Arts & Sciences in 2022.

== Philosophical work ==
=== Bioethics ===
McMahan has written extensively on normative and applied ethics, especially bioethics and just war theory. His publications in bioethics include The Ethics of Killing: Problems at the Margins of Life. The book consists of five parts: about identity, death, killing, the beginning of life, and the end of life. In its first part, McMahan defends a mixed view of personal identity, claiming that individuals are what he calls "embodied minds". In the following parts, he claims that the badness of death and the wrongness of killing depends on our interest in living. He also defends what he calls a "time-relative interest account of living". According to his view, our interest in living depends on our psychological connection to our future selves at each time.

=== Animal ethics ===
In relation to his contributions in bioethics, McMahan has also written on the subject of animal ethics, where he has argued against the moral relevance of species membership. He has also claimed that intensive animal farming is a major ethical problem. He has argued for a strong negative duty to stop the suffering inflicted on animals through modern industrial agriculture and against eating animals. McMahan has also participated in the ethical debate on wild animal suffering, making a case for intervening in nature to alleviate wild animal suffering when doing so would not cause more harm than good.

=== Just war theory ===
McMahan's main contributions to just war theory are in his book Killing in War, which argues against foundational elements of the traditional basis of just war theory. Against Michael Walzer, he claims that those who fight an unjust war can never meet the requirements of jus in bello.

=== Other work ===
McMahan co-edited the book The Morality of Nationalism with Robert McKim in 1997, and Ethics and Humanity. In the early 1980s, he wrote two books about the political situation at the time: British Nuclear Weapons: For and Against and Reagan and the World: Imperial Policy in the New Cold War. He also wrote the op-ed "The Meat Eaters", published in The New York Times. More recently, he has worked on effective altruism. He is on the editorial board of The Journal of Controversial Ideas.

== Selected publications ==
=== Articles ===
- McMahan, Jeff (2009). "Intention, permissibility, terrorism, and war". Philosophical Perspectives 23 (1):345-372.
- "The Meat Eaters". The Stone. The New York Times. September 19, 2010.
- "Predators: A Response". The Stone. The New York Times. September 28, 2010. Archived from the original on October 30, 2019.
- "Rethinking the 'Just War,' Part 1". The Stone. The New York Times. November 11, 2012.
- "Rethinking the 'Just War,' Part 2". The Stone. The New York Times. November 12, 2012.
- "Why Gun 'Control' Is Not Enough". The Stone. The New York Times. December 19, 2012.
- Cutting, Gary; McMahan, Jeff (December 19, 2012). "Can Torture Ever Be Moral?". The Stone. The New York Times.

=== Books ===
- The Ethics of Killing: Problems at the Margins of Life (Oxford University Press, 2002) (ISBN 0-195-16982-4)
- Killing in War (Oxford University Press, 2009) (ISBN 0-199-54866-8)
- The Ethics of Killing: Self-Defense, War, and Punishment (Oxford University Press, 2020) (ISBN 0-195-18721-0)

== See also ==
- American philosophy
- List of American philosophers
