= Ole Martin Moen =

Norwegian philosopher

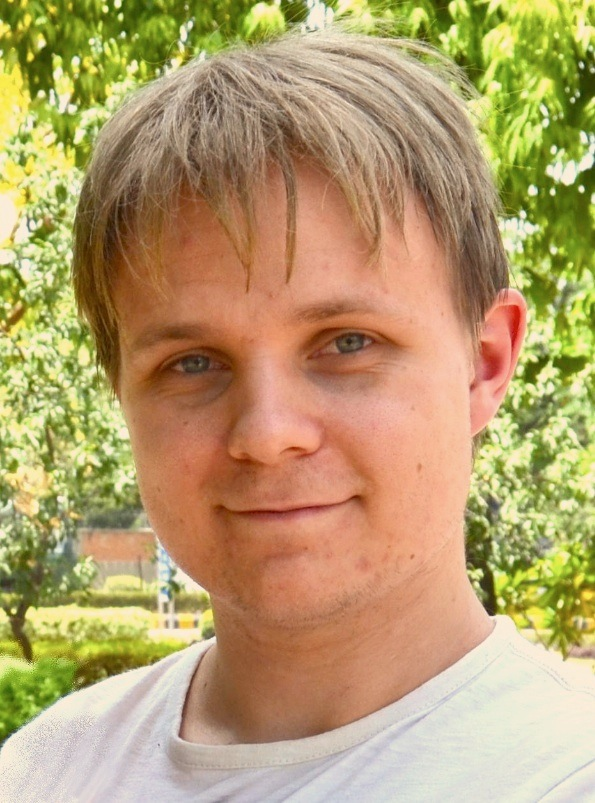
- Moen in 2013
- Born: 28 April 1985 (age 41)
- Awards: Zapffe Prize (2019)

Education
- Education: PhD in Philosophy, University of Oslo

Philosophical work
- Era: Contemporary philosophy
- Institutions: Oslo Metropolitan University; University of Oslo; University of Oxford
- Main interests: Animal ethics, bioethics, environmental ethics
- Website: www.olemartinmoen.com

Ole Martin Moen (Norwegian pronunciation: [ˈû:lə ˈmɑ̀ːtɪn ˈmù:ən]; born 28 April 1985) is a Norwegian philosopher who works primarily with applied ethics and value theory. He is Professor of Ethics at Oslo Metropolitan University and Researcher in Philosophy and Principal Investigator for the 5-year research project "What should not be bought and sold?" at the University of Oslo, funded by the Research Council of Norway.

== Education and career ==
Moen received a PhD in philosophy from the University of Oslo in 2013; his dissertation was on hedonism. While conducting PhD research, Moen was visiting scholar at the Uehiro Centre for Practical Ethics at the University of Oxford. As a master's student, he acted as visiting scholar at the University of California, Berkeley and University of Oxford.

Moen has published articles in journals such as the Journal of Medical Ethics, Journal of Bentham Studies, Philosophia, Reason Papers and Think. He has written on a number of controversial topics, including prostitution, active euthanasia, animal welfare, wild animal suffering, school, cosmetic surgery, monogamy, cryonics and transhumanism. Moen's articles have been published in Forbes, The Independent, Washington Times, Aftenposten and Morgenbladet. He is a in-house philosopher on the Norwegian radio show Verdibørsen and runs the podcast Moralistene with Aksel Braanen Sterri.

Together with two other teachers, he established the Humanistskolen in Oslo ("Humanist School in Oslo"). The school was initially refused approval from the Ministry of Education, but after the Ministry of Gender Equality and Discrimination Ombud (LDO) came to the conclusion that the Ministry had refused in contravention of the law, the school nevertheless received approval.

He is signed up for cryopreservation with the Alcor Life Extension Foundation.

== Politics ==
Moen was elected to the Øvre Eiker municipal council for the Progress Party in 2003 and served two years. In 2004, Moen announced his transition to the Liberal People's Party and justified it by saying that "the fight for a liberal FRP has been lost". In December 2005, he announced a move from the municipality, and Snorre Rogstad (Frp) thus took over the position as municipal council representative. Moen has also been secretary of Øvre Eiker Progress Party, deputy leader of the youth organization Liberalistisk Ungdom, leader of Liberalistisk Ungdoms fylkeslag in Oslo, leader of Human-Ethisk Studentlag and project employee at Civita in 2007. Moen has not had any office or association with party politics since leaving the Liberal People's Party.

== Awards ==
In 2019, Moen received the Zapffe Prize of kr 100,000 from the University of Oslo, for his article "Anti-Natalism and Human Enhancement". In the article on Peter Wessel Zapffe's philosophy, he argues against Zapffe's antinatalism, instead claiming that we should focus on improving the human condition using biotechnology.

== Publications ==
=== Articles ===
- Moen, Ole Martin (2019). "The Unabomber's ethics". Bioethics. 33 (2): 223–229. doi:10.1111/bioe.12494. hdl:10852/76721. ISSN 1467-8519. PMID 30136739. S2CID 52070603.
- Moen, Ole Martin (9 May 2016). "The ethics of wild animal suffering". Etikk I Praksis - Nordic Journal of Applied Ethics. 10 (1): 91–104. doi:10.5324/eip.v10i1.1972. ISSN 1890-4009.
- Moen, Ole Martin (August 2015). "The case for cryonics" (PDF). Journal of Medical Ethics. 41 (8): 677–681. doi:10.1136/medethics-2015-102715. ISSN 0306-6800. PMID 25717141. S2CID 31744039.
- Moen, Ole Martin (1 January 2015). "Hedonism Before Bentham" (PDF). Journal of Bentham Studies. 17: 1–18. doi:10.14324/111.2045-757X.007. ISSN 2045-757X.
- Moen, Ole Martin (2015). "The Ethics of Pedophilia" (PDF). University of Oslo: 14. ISSN 1890-3991 – via DUO Research Archive.
- Moen, Ole Martin (2014). "Should We Give Money to Beggars?". Think. 13 (37): 73–76. doi:10.1017/S1477175613000481. hdl:10852/59009. ISSN 1477-1756. S2CID 170350393.
- Moen, Ole Martin (1 February 2014). "Is prostitution harmful?". Journal of Medical Ethics. 40 (2): 73–81. doi:10.1136/medethics-2011-100367. ISSN 0306-6800. PMID 22930676.
- Moen, Ole Martin (1 February 2014). "Prostitution and harm: a reply to Anderson and McDougall". Journal of Medical Ethics. 40 (2): 84–85. doi:10.1136/medethics-2013-101389. ISSN 0306-6800. PMID 23698889. S2CID 207011061.
- Moen, Ole Martin (1 February 2014). "Prostitution and sexual ethics: a reply to Westin". Journal of Medical Ethics. 40 (2): 88. doi:10.1136/medethics-2013-101902. ISSN 0306-6800. PMID 24335659. S2CID 40060493.
- Moen, Ole Martin (2013). "The Unity and Commensurability of Pleasures and Pains" (PDF). Philosophia. 41 (2): 527–543. doi:10.1007/s11406-012-9383-4. S2CID 54587268.
- Moen, Ole Martin (2012). "Is Life the Ultimate Value?: A Reassessment of Ayn Rand's Ethics" (PDF). Reason Papers. 34 (2): 84–116.
- Moen, Ole Martin (2012). "Cosmetic Surgery". Think. 11 (31): 73–79. doi:10.1017/S1477175612000048. ISSN 1477-1756.

=== Books ===
- Moen, Ole Martin; Sterri, Aksel Braanen (2019). Aktiv dødshjelp: Etikk ved livets slutt. Oslo: Cappelen Damm Akademisk. ISBN 978-82-02-59484-8. OCLC 1115015596.
- Moen, Ole Martin (2011). Essayskriving kort og klart. Kristiansand: Høyskoleforl. ISBN 978-82-7634-932-0. OCLC 1028376478.
