= The Meat Eaters =

2010 essay by Jeff McMahan

- Author: Jeff McMahan
- Language: English
- Subjects: Ethics of eating meat; Wild animal suffering; Predation problem
- Published: September 19, 2010
- Published in: The New York Times
- Website: The Meat Eaters

"The Meat Eaters" is a 2010 essay by American philosopher Jeff McMahan, published in The New York Times on September 19, 2010. It examines the ethical implications of predation and the suffering of animals in nature. McMahan argues that humans have a moral obligation to stop killing animals for food and moral reasons to prevent suffering caused by other animals. He considers whether the gradual extinction or genetic modification of carnivorous species could be justified if it prevented suffering without causing greater harm. Although he concludes that there are reasons to desire the disappearance of carnivorous species, he cautions against attempting such interventions with existing scientific knowledge.

The essay prompted discussion about the moral status of wild animals, the ecological consequences of eliminating predators and the value of preserving species. McMahan responded to criticism in a follow-up essay, "Predators: A Response", and subsequently developed the subject in "The Moral Problem of Predation" (2015).

== Background ==
McMahan became interested in wild animal suffering following discussions with moral philosopher Oscar Horta, who introduced him to the subject. In 2010, he was invited to contribute an essay about animals to On the Human, an online discussion forum associated with the National Humanities Center. His contribution, subtitled "Would the controlled extinction of carnivorous species be a good thing?", was subsequently published in The New York Times on September 19, 2010.

In a 2015 interview with philosopher Catia Faria, McMahan explained that his discussions with Horta had led him to consider whether the moral reasons against causing suffering to animals also provided reasons to prevent suffering occurring independently of human activity. He identified the essay as an attempt to examine this question, particularly in relation to predation.

== Argument ==
=== Animal suffering and moral responsibility ===
McMahan opens by describing the suffering and deaths caused by predation, relating the subject to Arthur Schopenhauer's philosophical pessimism and the theological problem of evil. He contrasts the natural world with the vision of peaceful coexistence among animals in the Book of Isaiah, suggesting that a world in which conscious beings could survive without killing one another would be preferable.

He then turns to human consumption of animals, arguing that factory farming causes prolonged suffering and that humans should stop killing animals for food. McMahan distinguishes the direct harm caused by human practices from suffering occurring in nature. He considers the obligation not to cause suffering stronger than the moral reasons to prevent suffering for which humans are not responsible.

Nevertheless, McMahan argues that suffering is bad for the animal experiencing it regardless of its cause. He maintains that the absence of human responsibility for predation does not make the suffering of prey animals morally irrelevant. Even if humans have no obligation to prevent such suffering, he argues, they have moral reasons to do so when intervention would not produce worse consequences.

=== Preventing predation ===
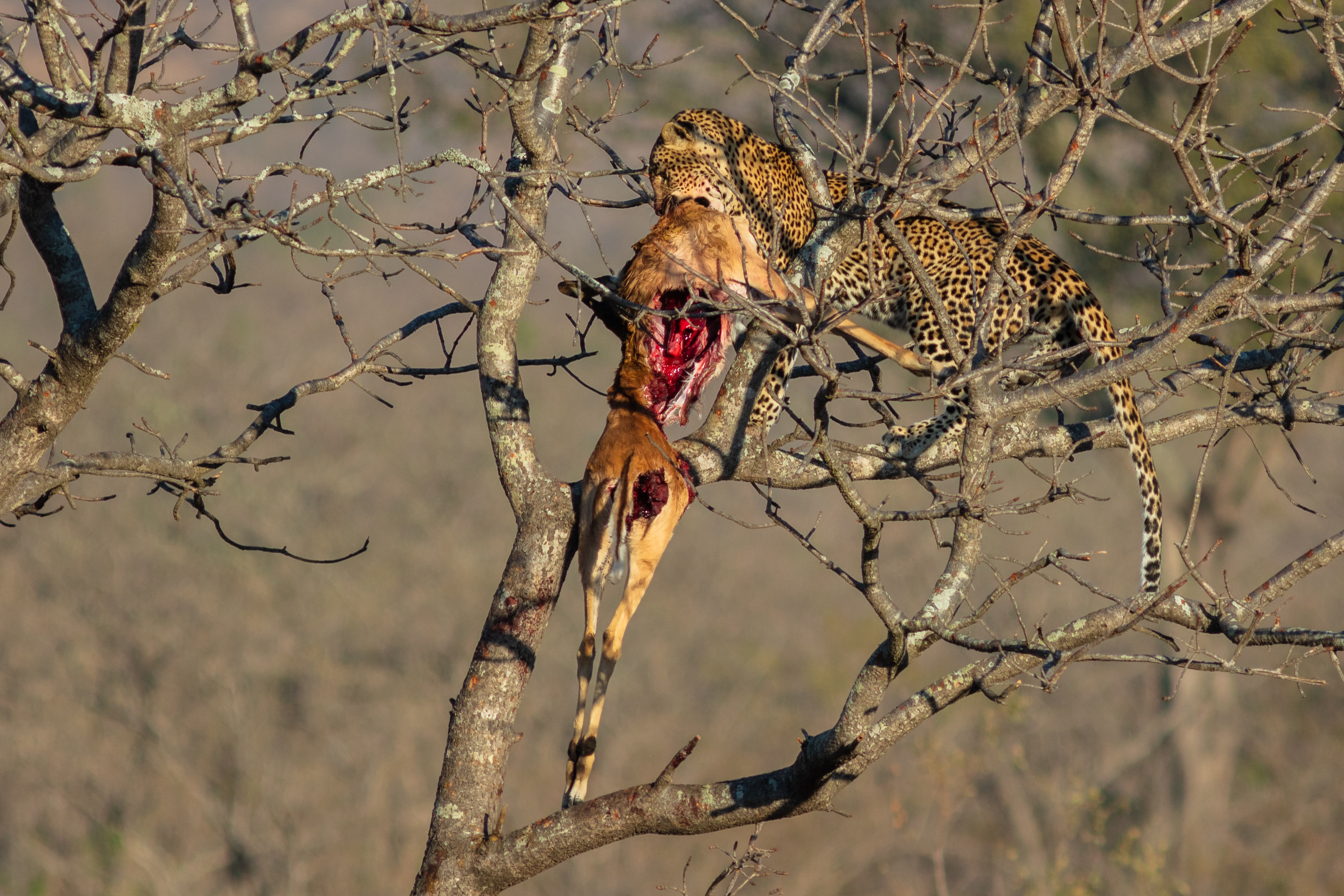
A leopard feeding on an impala in Kruger National Park. McMahan examines whether preventing predation could reduce suffering among wild animals.

McMahan considers two hypothetical means of ending predation: allowing carnivorous species to become extinct and replacing them with herbivorous species, or genetically modifying carnivores so that they could survive without killing other animals. He asks whether either course would be justified if it could be accomplished without imposing substantial costs on humans or other animals.

He acknowledges that the ecological consequences of such interventions cannot presently be predicted with sufficient confidence. Removing predators could cause prey populations to increase beyond the resources available to sustain them, resulting in overcrowding, starvation, disease and potentially greater suffering than predation itself. McMahan therefore considers attempts to eliminate predation unwise under existing scientific conditions.

Rather than proposing an immediate intervention, he argues that humans should consider the ethical principles that might guide future decisions about the preservation, alteration or extinction of species. He also observes that human activities already affect the survival of many species, often without deliberate consideration of their consequences.

=== Objections and the value of species ===
McMahan addresses objections based on the value of natural processes and the preservation of species. He rejects the claim that intervention would necessarily be wrong because it was unnatural or amounted to "playing God", arguing that neither objection establishes why the prevention of suffering would be impermissible.

He also considers whether animal species possess intrinsic value independently of the welfare of their individual members. Discussing philosopher Ronald Dworkin's account of the value placed on endangered species, McMahan questions whether the distinctions used to classify species provide grounds for regarding each existing species as morally irreplaceable.

McMahan acknowledges that extinction ordinarily has harmful consequences for animals and ecosystems. He nevertheless argues that the loss of a species does not necessarily harm its individual members and might benefit animals that would otherwise have been killed by its predators. He regards the question as a potential conflict between preventing suffering and preserving existing species.

He concludes that there are moral reasons to favor the extinction of carnivorous species if their disappearance could prevent suffering without causing greater harm. He does not advocate undertaking such measures with existing knowledge, instead maintaining that the ethical questions should be examined before future scientific developments make more extensive interventions possible.

== Reception ==
The essay drew responses from philosophers, science writers and commentators concerned with the ethical and ecological implications of preventing predation.

Max Fisher, writing in The Atlantic, discussed McMahan's argument as a philosophical thought experiment rather than an immediately practicable proposal. Fisher noted the potential ecological consequences of eliminating predators, including increased herbivore populations and the possibility of greater suffering.

In a response on the Practical Ethics blog, philosopher Alexandre Erler argued that McMahan presented a case for preventing suffering through a reduction in predation, provided that the intervention did not cause greater harm. Erler questioned whether the extinction of carnivorous species would be preferable to modifying them to survive without hunting, suggesting that the latter approach might preserve more of the value associated with existing species.

Erler also rejected objections based solely on an intervention being unnatural, while acknowledging the difficulty of predicting its ecological consequences. He argued that reducing the suffering directly caused by humans was a more immediate and practical priority.

Science writer Brian Switek criticized McMahan's argument in Wired, contending that it underestimated the ecological functions of predators. Drawing on research concerning dingoes in Australia, Switek described how large predators can suppress smaller predators, reducing threats to some prey populations. He argued that removing apex predators could consequently increase rather than reduce suffering among other animals.

Wesley J. Smith, writing in First Things, criticized McMahan's emphasis on preventing suffering. Smith characterized the proposal as a form of animal eugenics and argued that attempts to eliminate suffering could lead to harmful interventions undertaken in pursuit of an unattainable ideal.

In their 2012 article "Innocent Threats and the Moral Problem of Carnivorous Animals", philosophers Rainer Ebert and Tibor R. Machan cited "The Meat Eaters" as an example of a consequentialist approach to predation. Their analysis instead focused on rights-based theories, particularly that of Tom Regan. They argued that the problem of predation exposed difficulties in Regan's account of animal rights and considered alternative approaches to those difficulties.

== Subsequent discussion and publication ==
On September 28, 2010, McMahan published a follow-up essay, "Predators: A Response", addressing criticism of "The Meat Eaters". He reiterated that efforts to eliminate predators would be unjustified if they caused greater suffering through ecological disruption.

McMahan also discussed the possible extinction of the Siberian tiger, questioning whether efforts to restore a large population of the species would be justified if doing so increased suffering among prey animals. He presented this as an example of a conflict between the preservation of endangered species and the prevention of suffering.

McMahan later developed his arguments in "The Moral Problem of Predation", a chapter in the 2015 collection Philosophy Comes to Dinner.

"The Meat Eaters" was reprinted in The Stone Reader: Modern Philosophy in 133 Arguments (2015), edited by Peter Catapano and Simon Critchley.

== See also ==
- Compassionate conservation – Discipline combining conservation and animal welfare
- Suffering-focused ethics – Ethical views prioritising the reduction of suffering
- The Importance of Wild-Animal Suffering – 2009 essay by Brian Tomasik
