= Ecology of fear =

Conceptual framework describing predator-stress

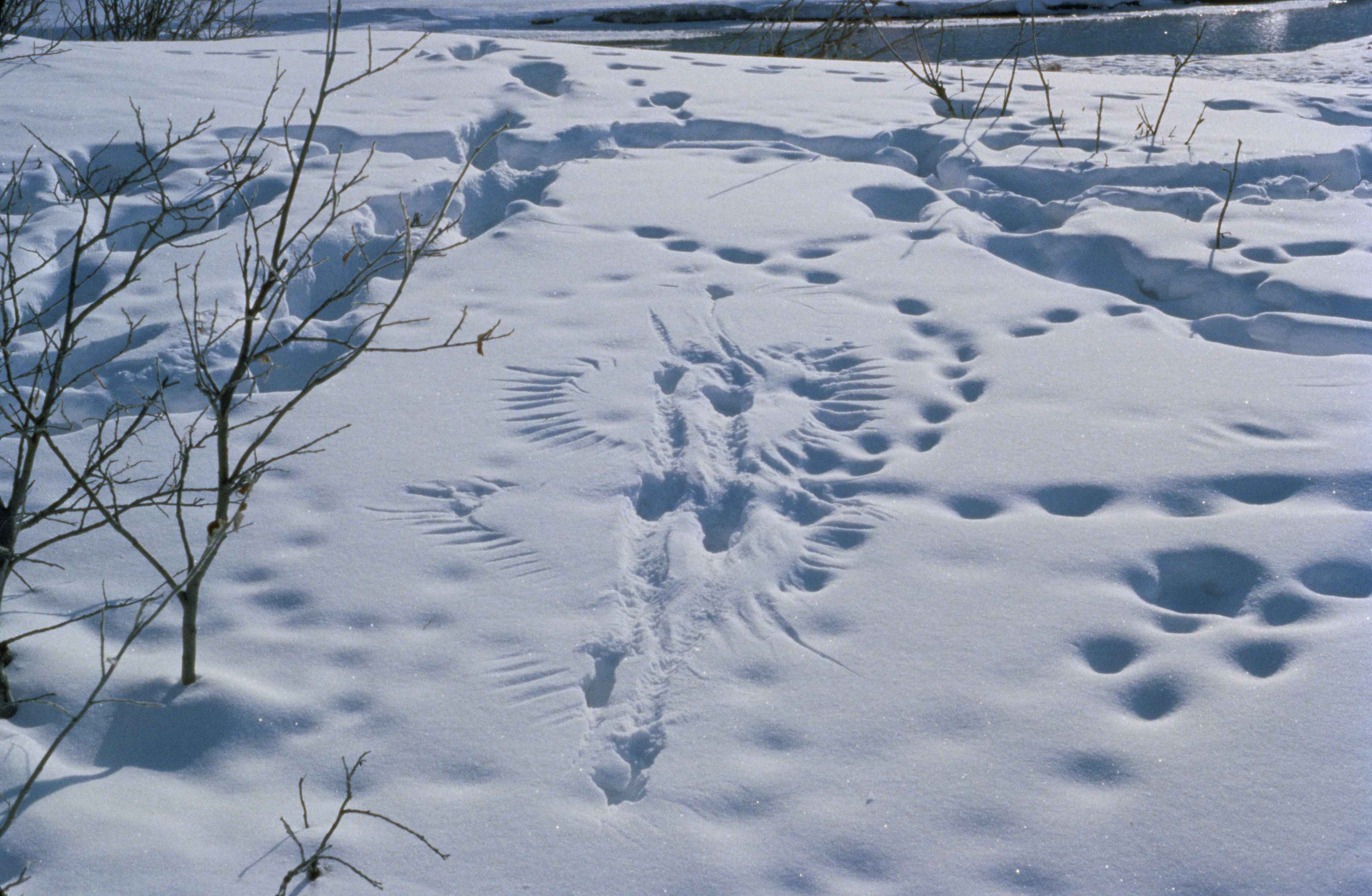
Snow imprints showing traces of predator-prey interaction

The ecology of fear is a conceptual framework in ecology that describes the effects of predator-induced stress on prey animals, populations, and ecosystems. The effect of predators has often been studied in terms of the prey animals they kill, but research on the ecology of fear examines non-lethal effects, including changes in prey behaviour, physiology, reproduction, survival, and population size.

Prey animals use anti-predator defences to reduce the risk of being killed. These defences can improve survival but may also involve costs, such as reduced feeding, reproduction, or use of preferred habitat.

== History ==
The term was used in the 1999 paper "The Ecology of Fear: Optimal Foraging, Game Theory, and Trophic Interactions", which argued that "a predator [...] depletes a food patch [...] by frightening prey rather than by actually killing prey." Later studies used the term in research on predator effects beyond direct killing.

In the 2000s, the ecology of fear received wider attention in connection with the reintroduction of wolves into Yellowstone. Researchers examined whether wolves affected the feeding behaviour and habitat use of elk, and whether these changes contributed to the regrowth of aspen and willows. Other studies and commentators have argued that the regrowth may also be explained by other factors, and that the effect of wolves on elk behaviour was sometimes overstated.

Media coverage of wolves in Yellowstone contributed to public interest in the concept. The New York Times mentioned the subject, and the March 2010 issue of National Geographic included a fold-out illustration on wolves and Yellowstone. The YouTube video How Wolves Change Rivers presented a popular account of the subject, but some scientists described it as an overstatement.

Research has also applied the framework to other predator-prey systems. A study comparing shark and wolf research found similar behavioural responses by prey in both systems. Other research has examined whether similar processes occur in host-parasite and host-pathogen interactions. Related work on parasite avoidance has also been described as the "ecology of disgust".

Some critics argue that the cognitive and emotional aspects of predator avoidance remain uncertain. In a 2009 paper on predation risk and elk reproduction, Scott Creel, John A. Winnie, and David Christianson wrote that this uncertainty applied to "virtually all studies of 'the ecology of fear'".

== Landscape of fear ==
The landscape of fear is a related model describing how animals perceive spatial variation in predation risk. It proposes that prey behaviour is shaped by areas of greater or lesser danger within a landscape.

== Relationship to post-traumatic stress disorder ==
A 2011 paper described exposure to predators as a life-threatening psychological stressor used in animal models of post-traumatic stress disorder (PTSD). The authors suggested that ecologists and neuroscientists could collaborate in studying the neurological effects of predator-induced fear and stress in wild animals.

In 2019, a study reported lasting behavioural effects and PTSD-like changes in the brains of wild animals following fear-inducing interactions with predators.

== Human impact ==
Studies have found that fear of humans can affect animal behaviour. Research discussed in Smithsonian Magazine reported that fear of humans can affect apex predators such as pumas.

The moral philosopher Oscar Horta has argued against some predator reintroductions, contending that they can conflict with the well-being and interests of animals already living in the area by creating or increasing fear and predation risk.

== See also ==
- Predator-prey dynamics – Equations modelling predator–prey cycles
- Wild animal suffering – Suffering of wild animals due to natural processes
