= Wild animal suffering =

Suffering of wild animals due to natural processes

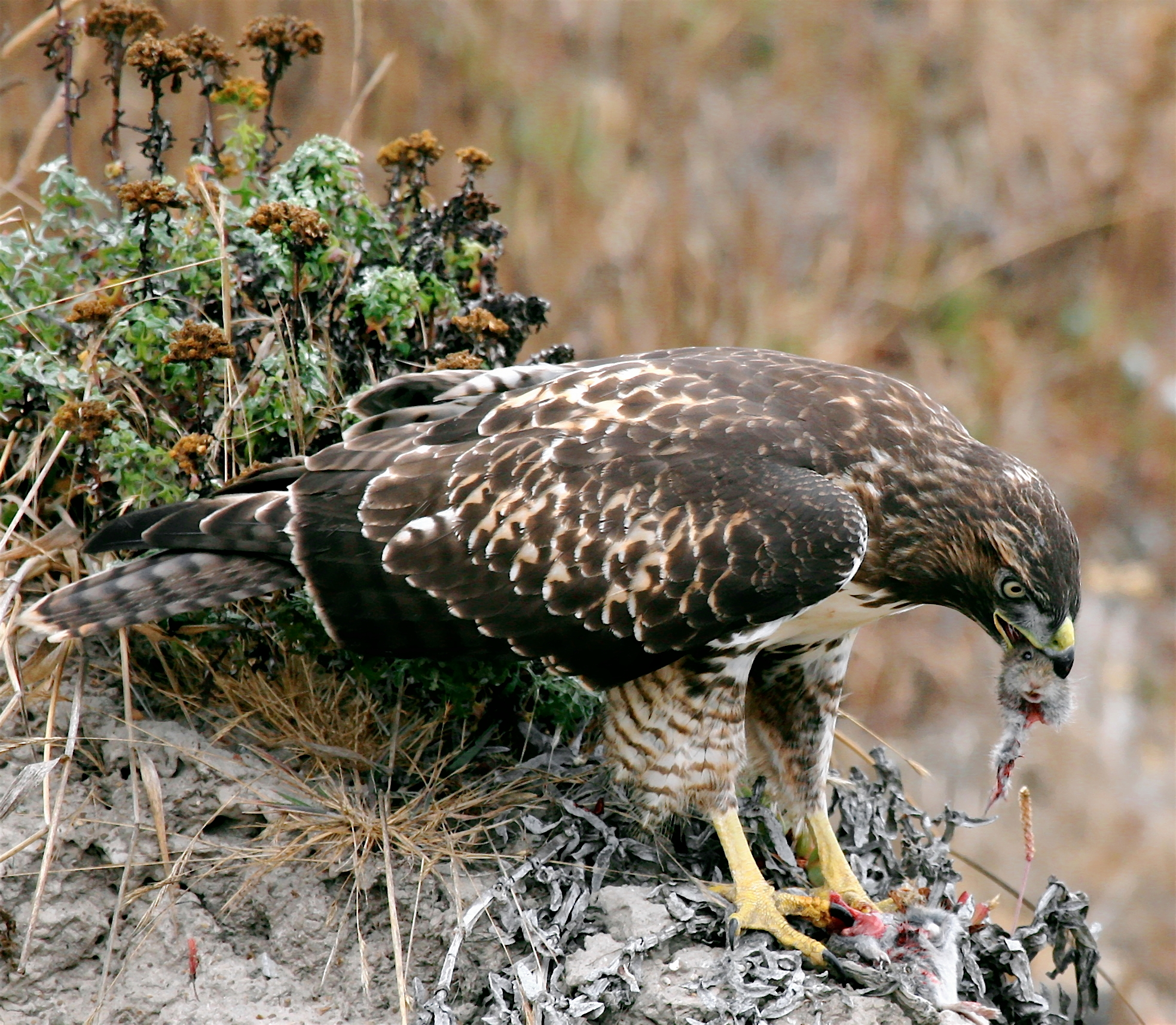
A juvenile red-tailed hawk feeding on a California vole

Wild animal suffering refers to the suffering experienced by wild animals from causes such as disease, injury, parasitism, starvation, dehydration, extreme weather, natural disasters, predation, and psychological stress. The subject encompasses the extent and severity of these harms, their moral significance, and whether humans have obligations to prevent or alleviate them.

The extent of suffering among wild animals is difficult to determine. Some writers argue that natural selection, high reproductive rates, and high juvenile mortality expose large numbers of animals to suffering and early death. Others caution that mortality and population dynamics alone cannot establish whether wild animals generally experience more suffering than well-being.

Suffering among wild animals has been discussed in theology, philosophy, and literature, particularly in relation to the problem of evil, predation, and the struggle for existence. Nineteenth-century writers including Lewis Gompertz and Charles Darwin examined suffering arising from natural processes. Since the late twentieth century, philosophers including Peter Singer, Steve F. Sapontzis, Oscar Horta, and Catia Faria have examined whether humans have obligations to alleviate such suffering. The subject has also developed as an area of research on wild animal welfare, following Yew-Kwang Ng's proposal for welfare biology in 1995.

A central ethical question is whether humans should intervene to reduce suffering caused by natural processes. Supporters of intervention appeal to animal welfare, animal rights, and opposition to speciesism; critics raise concerns about ecological consequences, the value of wildness, and the autonomy of wild animals. Existing forms of assistance include wildlife rescue, vaccination, and emergency provision of food or water. More extensive proposals involve changes to wildlife management or the use of new technologies. Related debates concern conservation welfare and rewilding.

== Sources and extent of suffering ==
=== Sources of harm ===
==== Disease ====
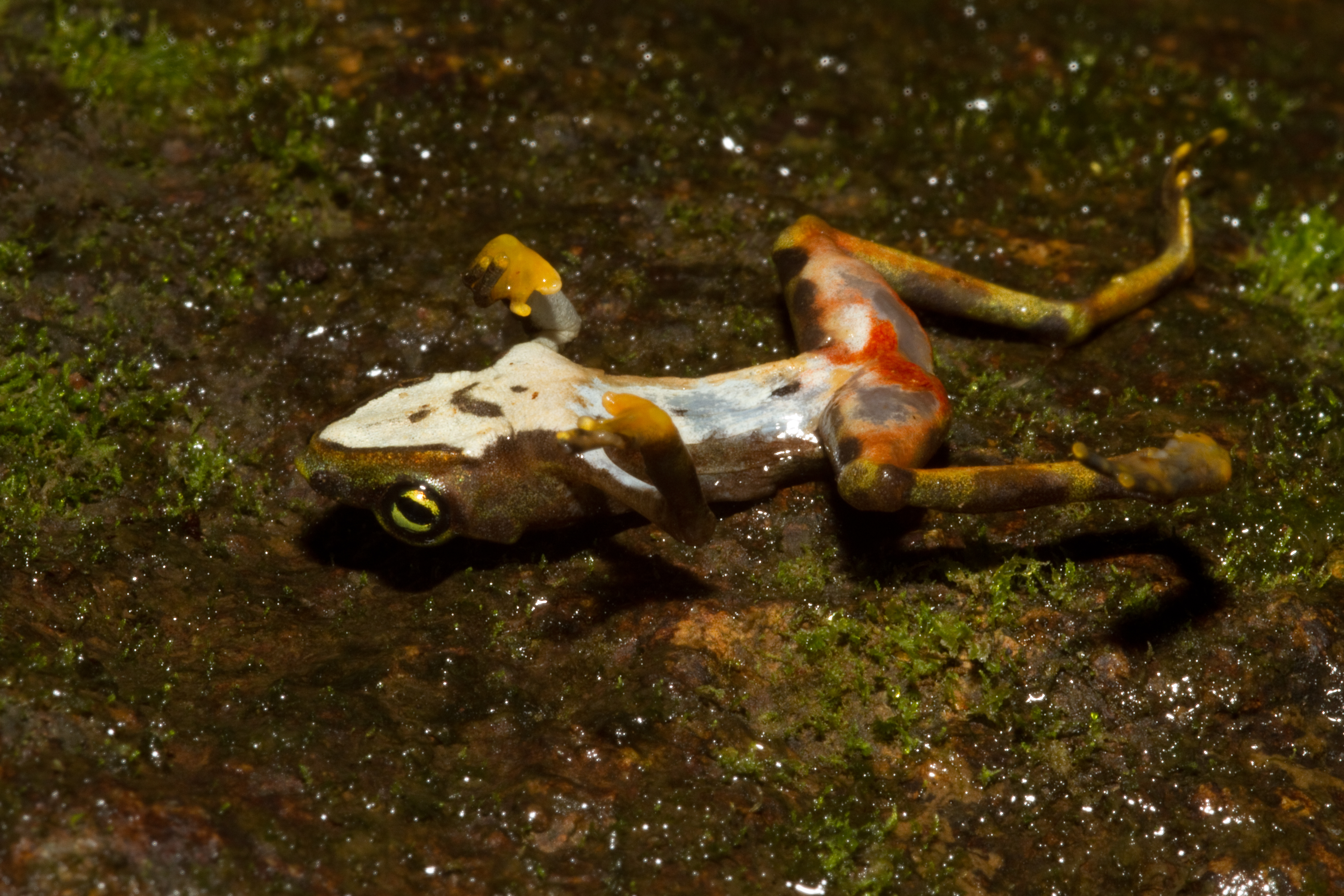
Dead limosa harlequin frog showing symptoms of chytridiomycosis

Wild animals are affected by infectious diseases that circulate within populations, as well as by epizootic outbreaks. Examples include chronic wasting disease, white-nose syndrome, devil facial tumour disease, myxomatosis, viral haemorrhagic disease, and chytridiomycosis. Disease can cause pain, weakness, respiratory illness, ulcers, starvation, and other harms before recovery or death. Poor physical condition can increase susceptibility to infection, which can in turn further weaken an animal.

==== Injury ====
Wild animals can be injured by predators, intraspecific competition, accidents, extreme weather, and natural disasters. Injuries may cause pain and impair movement, feeding, drinking, escape from predators, and social behaviour. They can also increase vulnerability to infection, parasitism, starvation, dehydration, and further attacks.

==== Parasitism ====
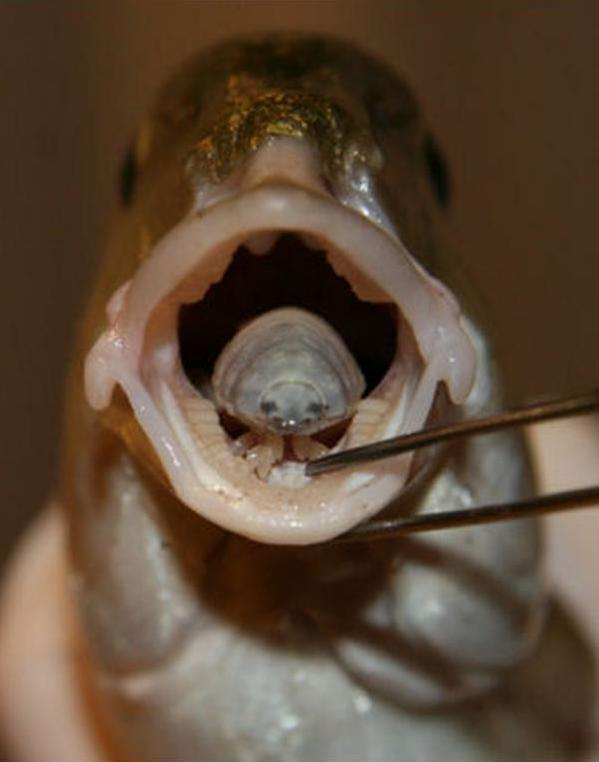
Tongue-eating lice attach inside their fish hosts' mouths and can replace the function of the tongue

Parasites can harm wild animals by consuming resources, damaging tissue, altering behaviour, and reducing movement, reproduction, or survival. Some parasites alter the bodies or behaviour of their hosts, including Ribeiroia ondatrae, which can cause limb malformations in amphibians, and parasites that manipulate the behaviour of insect hosts. A meta-analysis found higher mortality among animals affected by parasites than among unaffected animals.

Parasitoids differ from parasites in that they ultimately kill their hosts. Parasitoid larvae, including those of some wasps, flies, beetles, and worms, may develop by feeding on the tissues or fluids of a living host.

==== Starvation and dehydration ====
Limited food availability, injury, disease, impaired teeth, competition, and seasonal conditions can cause starvation or malnutrition. Young, old, sick, and weakened animals may be particularly vulnerable. Food availability can constrain wild animal populations, and death from starvation may be prolonged.

Water scarcity can likewise cause dehydration and can force animals to leave shelter in search of water, potentially increasing exposure to predators. Dehydration can occur alongside starvation, while some diseases can increase water loss.

==== Weather and natural disasters ====
Extreme temperatures, droughts, floods, storms, and heavy snow can injure or kill animals and increase their exposure to starvation, dehydration, and disease. Extreme weather events can also cause large-scale mortality; for example, the loss of sea ice following severe weather has caused mass breeding failure among emperor penguin colonies.

Natural disasters, including fires, volcanic eruptions, earthquakes, tsunamis, hurricanes, and floods, can cause death, injury, disease, displacement, and shortages or contamination of food and water. Wildfires can cause direct mortality and injury as well as displacement, habitat disruption, and reduced food availability, with effects varying among species and ecosystems.

==== Predation and intraspecific conflict ====
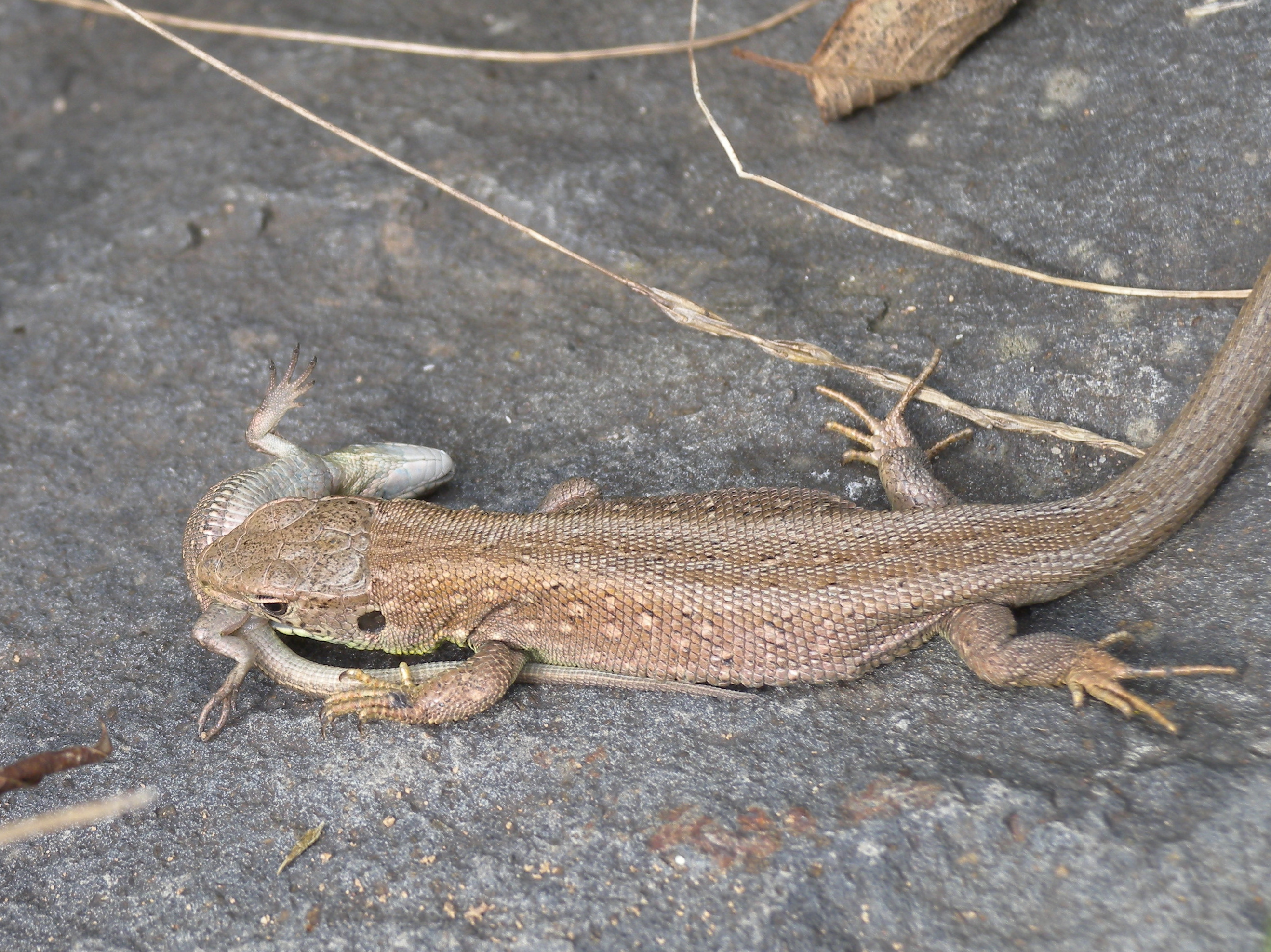
Cannibalism in sand lizards

Predation can expose prey animals to pursuit, injury, and death. Depending on the predator and prey involved, animals may be killed before consumption, swallowed alive, or immobilized by venom. Animals may also be injured or killed by members of their own species through territorial conflict, competition, cannibalism, infanticide, and siblicide.

==== Psychological stress ====
Wild animals may experience stress arising from disease, food scarcity, social interactions, and the threat of predation. The ecology of fear concerns the effects of perceived predation risk on animal behaviour, physiology, and survival. Experimental research has found that exposure to predators can produce lasting behavioural and neurological changes in wild animals resembling effects associated with post-traumatic stress disorder in humans.

=== Number of affected individuals ===
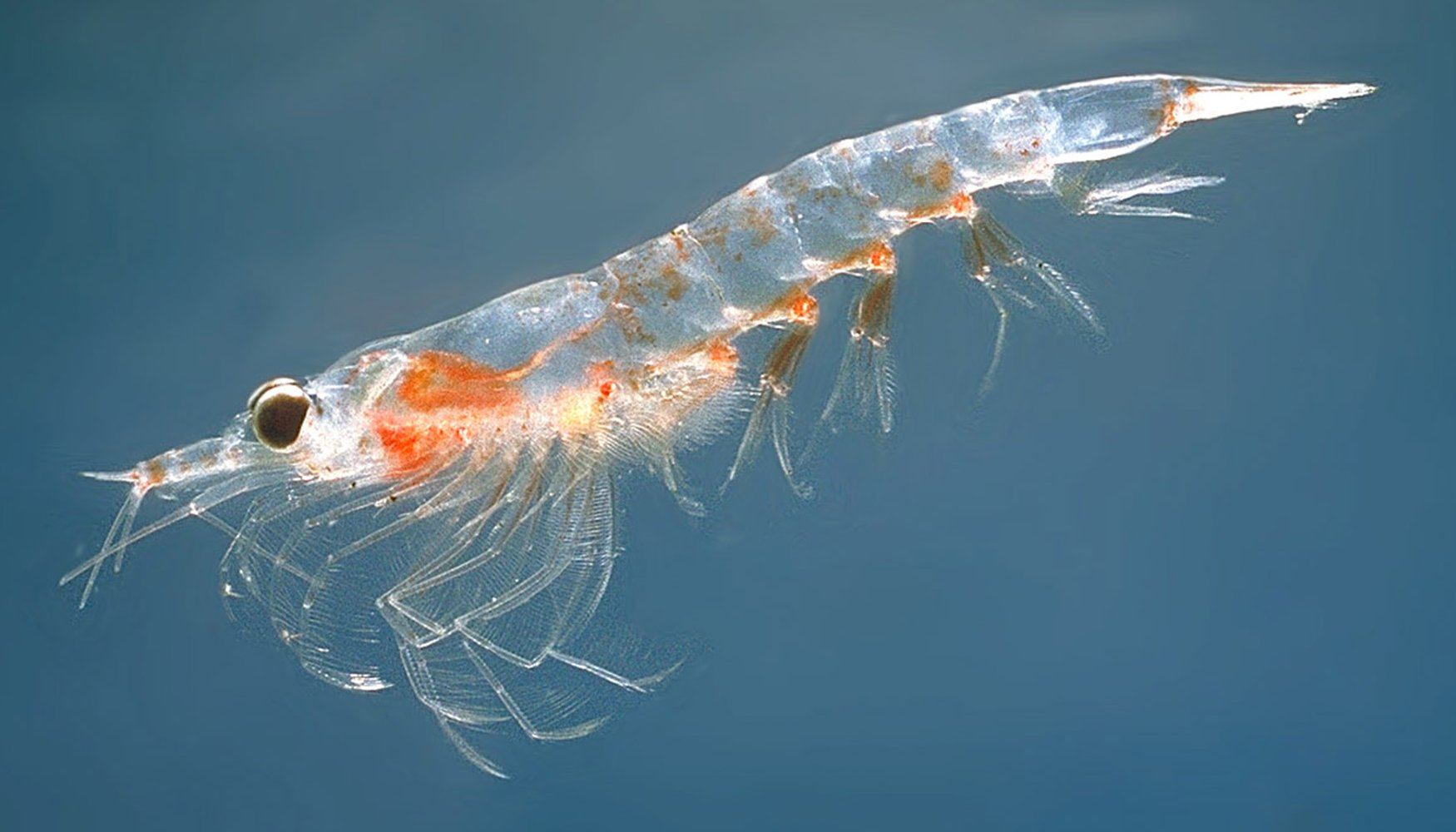
Marine arthropods, such as this Northern krill, are estimated to be among the most numerous groups of wild animals.

Global estimates of the numbers of wild animals are subject to substantial uncertainty. One 2018 analysis estimated approximately 10^{15} fish, 10^{11} wild birds, 10^{18} terrestrial arthropods, 10^{20} marine arthropods, 10^{18} annelids, 10^{18} molluscs, and 10^{16} cnidarians, excluding wild mammals. A 2022 study estimated a global population of about 20 quadrillion ants. Writers concerned with wild animal suffering cite these population estimates to argue that natural harms may affect substantially more individuals than harms directly caused by humans.

=== Evolution and population dynamics ===
Natural selection favors traits that affect survival and reproduction, not necessarily those that improve individual welfare. Pain and other aversive experiences may therefore persist when they contribute to survival or reproduction, or when they do not substantially reduce reproductive success. Richard Dawkins has likewise argued that natural selection does not operate to maximize individual welfare and that suffering can arise from competition, predation, parasitism, and Malthusian population pressures.

Some writers draw particular attention to species that produce large numbers of offspring, sometimes described as r-selected, because only a small proportion may survive to reproductive maturity. They argue that high juvenile mortality means that many individual animals may have short lives ending through starvation, predation, disease, or other causes.

In 1995, Yew-Kwang Ng proposed a model suggesting that evolutionary dynamics could cause suffering to predominate over enjoyment in nature. In 2019, Ng and Zach Groff identified an error in the original model that invalidated its conclusion about the predominance of suffering. Their corrected analysis did not establish whether suffering or enjoyment predominates; it suggested that the outcome depends on other characteristics of a species.

Heather Browning and Walter Veit have also challenged the assumption that wild animals generally experience more suffering than positive welfare. In a 2023 paper, they argue that existing evidence does not establish this conclusion and that research on wild animal welfare should account for positive experiences as well as harms.

== History of views on wild animal suffering ==
=== Religious and theological views ===
==== Christianity and natural theology ====
William Paley defended a providential interpretation of nature, arguing that predation formed part of a divinely ordered system.

The suffering of animals in nature has been discussed in connection with the problem of evil and divine providence. In 1709, English naturalist and clergyman Thomas Robinson discussed predation in relation to divine providence. He acknowledged that prey animals could be torn apart and eaten alive, but defended predation as part of the intended order of nature, arguing that carnivorous animals were adapted to their place in creation and that predation regulated animal populations.

In Dialogues Concerning Natural Religion (1779), David Hume invoked predation to question claims that nature was benevolently ordered, describing animals as keeping one another in "perpetual terror and anxiety". William Paley, by contrast, defended a providential interpretation of nature in Natural Theology (1802). Although he acknowledged that animals died through violence, disease, starvation, and other causes, he argued that predation formed part of a divinely ordered system and served to regulate animal populations.

==== Buddhism, Hinduism and Jainism ====
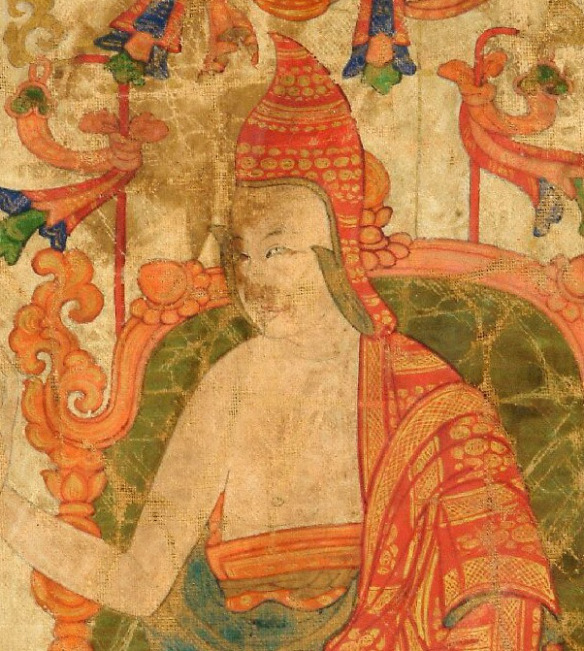
In the Bodhisattvacaryāvatāra, Shantideva prayed that animals be freed from the fear of predation.

Ole Martin Moen identifies teachings in Jainism, Buddhism, and Hinduism that regard suffering as harmful to those who experience it and recognize suffering in the natural world.

In Buddhist doctrine, rebirth as an animal is regarded as undesirable because animals suffer from both human and natural causes. Animal suffering has also been interpreted as an example of dukkha. Buddhist writers including Shantideva and Patrul Rinpoche described animals as vulnerable to predation, fear, and other harms, and as beings toward whom compassion should be directed. Calvin Baker argues that wild animal suffering presents difficulties for both traditional Buddhist accounts involving rebirth and naturalized forms of Buddhism that reject it.

Lisa Kemmerer argues that Hindu literature presents animals as conscious beings connected to humans and gods. She discusses texts including the Vedas, Mahabharata, Ramayana, and Panchatantra, and relates reincarnation, karma, and ahimsa to duties of compassion and non-injury toward animals. Michael C. Morris and Richard H. Thornhill argue that some Hindu texts provide doctrinal support for the view that spiritual sanctity can reduce conflict among animals.

=== Early modern views ===
Leonardo da Vinci discussed conflict, predation, and animal death in his notebooks. In his notebooks, he characterized nature as at times "rather a cruel stepmother than a mother" and observed that animals survive through the deaths of others. He asked why nature had not arranged that "one animal should not live by the death of another", and answered that nature continually produces new life while disposing of organisms through predation, disease, and other causes.

In Histoire Naturelle, Georges-Louis Leclerc, Comte de Buffon, described wild animals as exposed to hunger, harsh winters, exhaustion, parasites, and other sources of suffering. He nevertheless defended predation as a means of limiting populations that would otherwise increase beyond available resources.

=== Nineteenth century ===
==== Moral critiques of nature ====
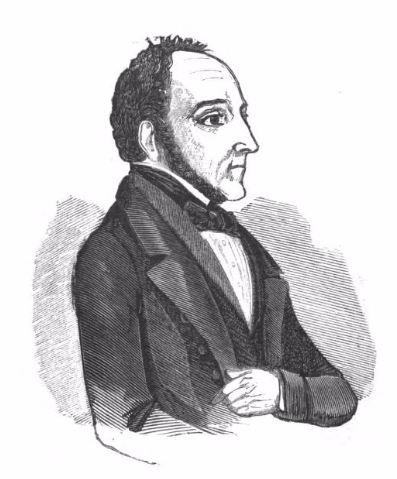
Lewis Gompertz considered whether humans should assist animals suffering from natural causes

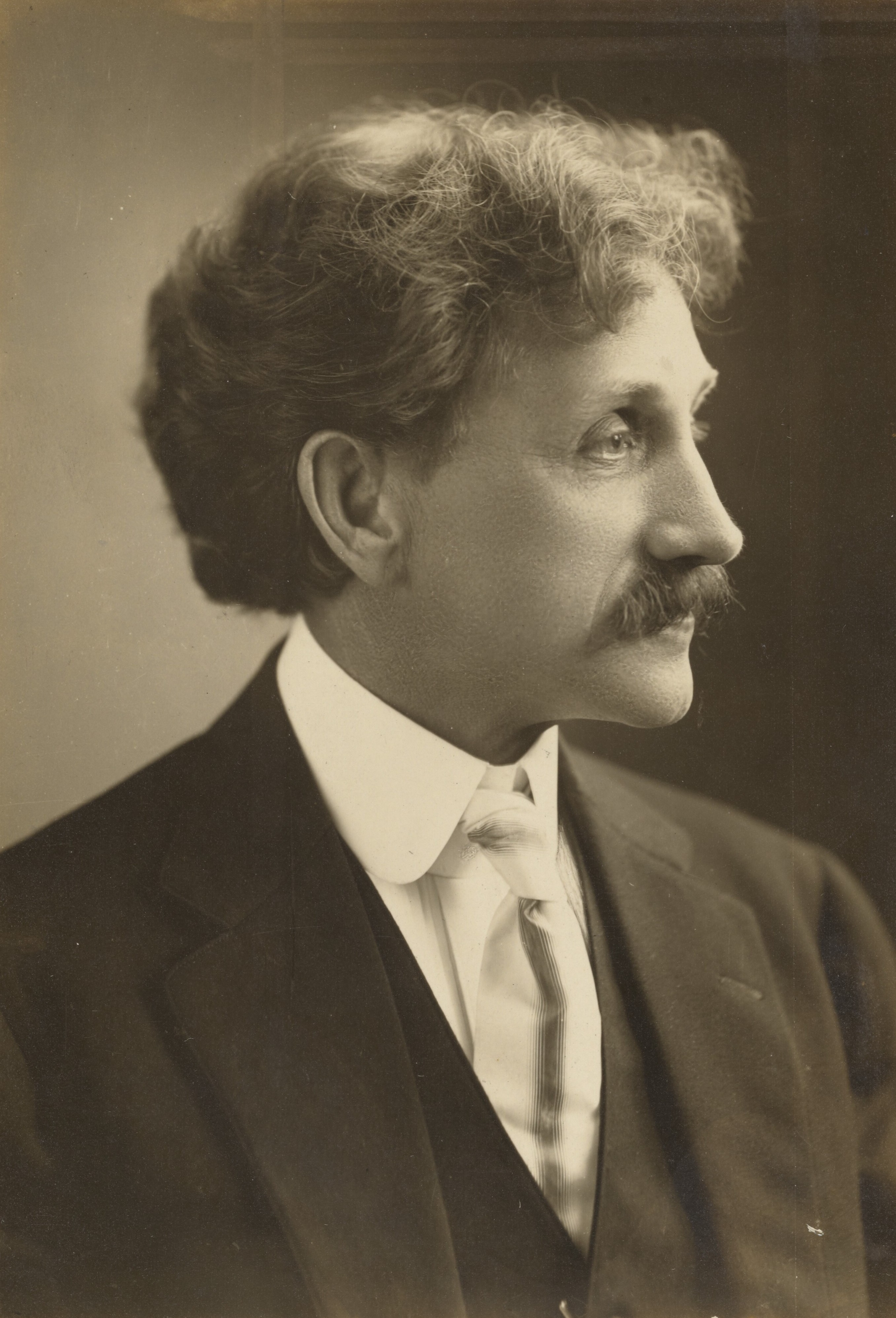
J. Howard Moore argued that humans should reduce suffering produced by natural selection where possible

In Moral Inquiries on the Situation of Man and of Brutes (1824), Lewis Gompertz argued for an egalitarian view of human and non-human animals and considered whether humans should assist animals suffering in the wild. He described both humans and other animals in a natural state as vulnerable to starvation, predators, injury, adverse weather, and illness without reliable assistance, and stated that he would attempt to save an animal being killed by another animal, although he expressed uncertainty about the morality of doing so.

Giacomo Leopardi and Arthur Schopenhauer discussed suffering among wild animals in their accounts of philosophical pessimism. Leopardi described predation and the destruction of living beings as part of a natural cycle in which the preservation of some organisms depends on the suffering and death of others, and argued that this conflicted with portrayals of nature as ordered for the happiness of living beings. Schopenhauer likewise treated predation as evidence for the predominance of suffering over pleasure, suggesting that the pleasure of an animal eating another should be compared with the suffering of the animal being eaten.

In the essay "Nature", published posthumously in 1874, John Stuart Mill rejected the view that nature provides a moral standard, observing that many acts condemned among humans are commonplace in the natural world. He described animals as divided into "devourers and devoured" and argued that harmful natural processes should not be accepted merely because they are natural.

In Animals' Rights: Considered in Relation to Social Progress (1892), Henry Stephens Salt argued that wild animals should be left unharmed unless they directly threatened human welfare. He allowed action in self-defense or to prevent serious harm but rejected needless killing and torment.

In Better-World Philosophy (1899), J. Howard Moore criticized natural selection for producing predation, competition, and suffering among animals. He argued that humans should use their intellectual and moral capacities to reduce these harms where possible. In The Universal Kinship (1906), Moore again described the living world as pervaded by suffering arising from the processes through which life had developed and suggested that human concern for other beings could improve conditions in nature.

==== Evolution and suffering ====
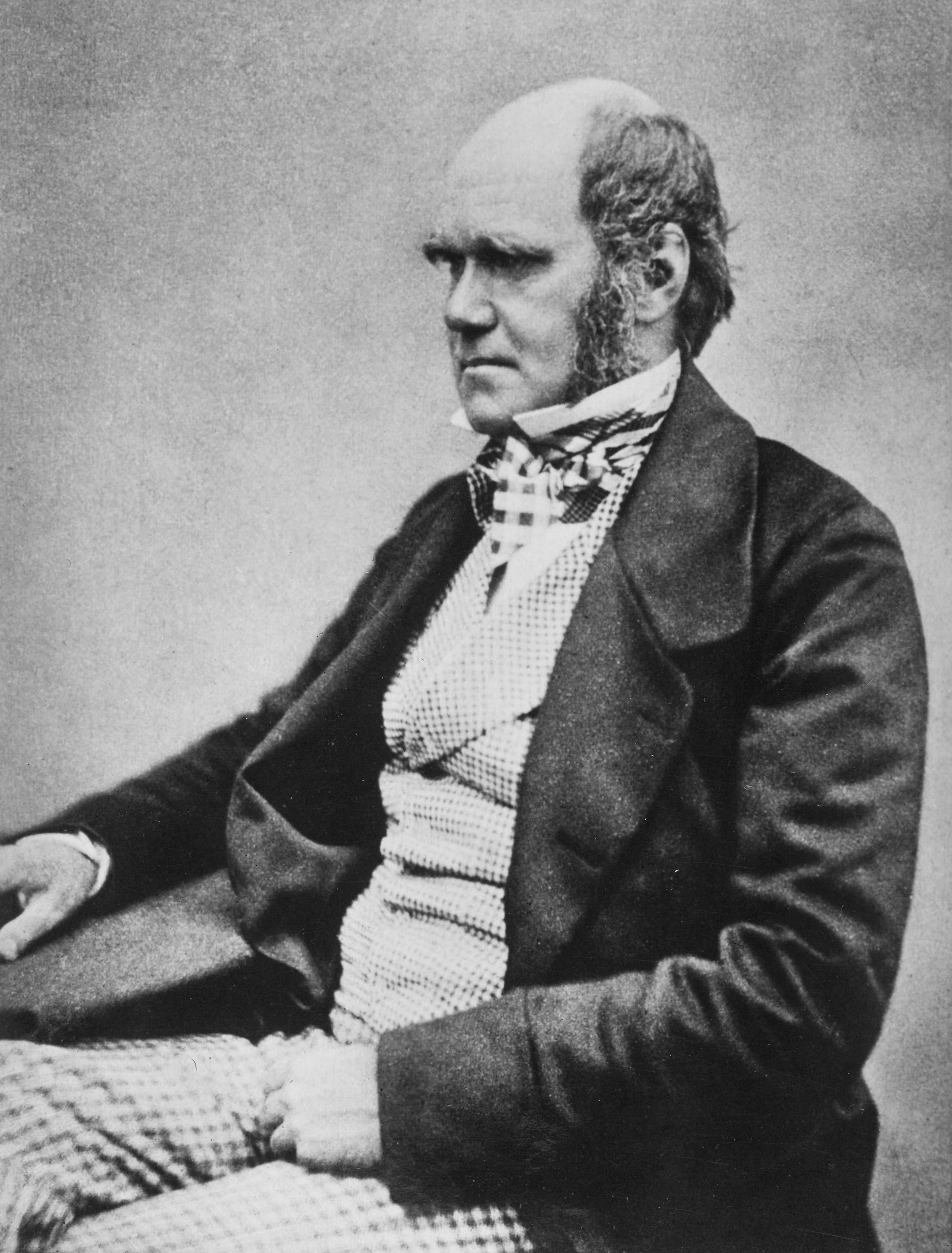
Charles Darwin discussed animal suffering in relation to natural selection and the problem of evil

Charles Darwin considered animal suffering in relation to natural selection and the problem of evil. In his autobiography, Darwin maintained that happiness generally predominated among sentient beings, reasoning that prolonged pain reduces an animal's capacity for action while pleasurable sensations can serve as recurring guides to behavior. He nevertheless acknowledged that animals sometimes suffer greatly and argued that natural selection favors reproductive success rather than freedom from suffering. In an 1860 letter to Asa Gray, Darwin wrote that he could not reconcile a benevolent and omnipotent God with the intentional creation of Ichneumonidae, whose larvae feed within living caterpillars, or with cats playing with mice.

In A Candid Examination of Theism (1878), George Romanes treated competition, predation, parasitism, hunger, and disease among sentient animals as an objection to divine benevolence. Thomas Henry Huxley similarly described predation, disease, old age, and overpopulation in "The Struggle for Existence in Human Society" (1888), rejecting the claim that later products of evolution could compensate earlier animals for their suffering. In Evolution and Ethics (1893), he argued more generally that ethical progress depended on resisting rather than imitating the "cosmic process".

Other writers on evolution defended the processes that caused suffering. In Evolution and Its Relation to Religious Thought (1888), Joseph Le Conte treated suffering in the animal kingdom as part of the problem of evil but argued that struggle against an adverse environment was necessary for organic evolution and could be regarded as good in relation to its results. In Darwinism (1889), Alfred Russel Wallace argued that accounts of suffering produced by the struggle for existence were exaggerated. He maintained that wild animals generally lacked anticipatory fear of death, that violent deaths were often rapid, and that natural selection tended to produce abundant life with comparatively little suffering. He developed this position in The World of Life (1910), arguing that pain had evolved only to the degree needed for survival and that predation generally involved limited suffering. André Luis de Lima Carvalho interprets Wallace's account as part of his attempt to reconcile Darwinian evolution with a spiritualist theology involving divine benevolence.

=== Twentieth century ===
In Our Vanishing Wild Life (1913), William Temple Hornaday described wild animals as vulnerable to climate, starvation, and disease, discussing birds dying in freezing rain, wild ducks suffering from hunger and cold, and disease among several mammal species. In The Minds and Manners of Wild Animals (1922), he described fear as the "ruling passion" of wild animals and proposed a "Bill of Rights for Wild Animals".

In "Which Shall We Protect? Thoughts on the Ethics of the Treatment of Free Life" (1952), Alexander Skutch discussed several possible principles governing human relations with free-living animals, including laissez-faire, ahimsa, and what he called "harmonious association". He favored an approach combining these principles.

==== Emergence of the intervention debate ====
From the 1970s, philosophers debated whether duties toward wild animals extend to preventing harms arising independently of human actions. In 1973, Peter Singer addressed whether humans should prevent predation, stating that intervention would be justified if it produced better consequences while warning of the risk of increasing suffering in the long term. Stephen R. L. Clark argued that humans should protect wild animals from serious dangers but were not required to regulate all natural interactions. J. Baird Callicott contrasted animal liberation with Aldo Leopold's land ethic, drawing attention to conflicts between concern for individual animals and holistic environmental approaches.

Later writers including Steve F. Sapontzis, Arne Næss, and David Olivier also considered whether humans have duties toward animals suffering from natural processes.

=== Twenty-first century ===
==== Publications and research ====
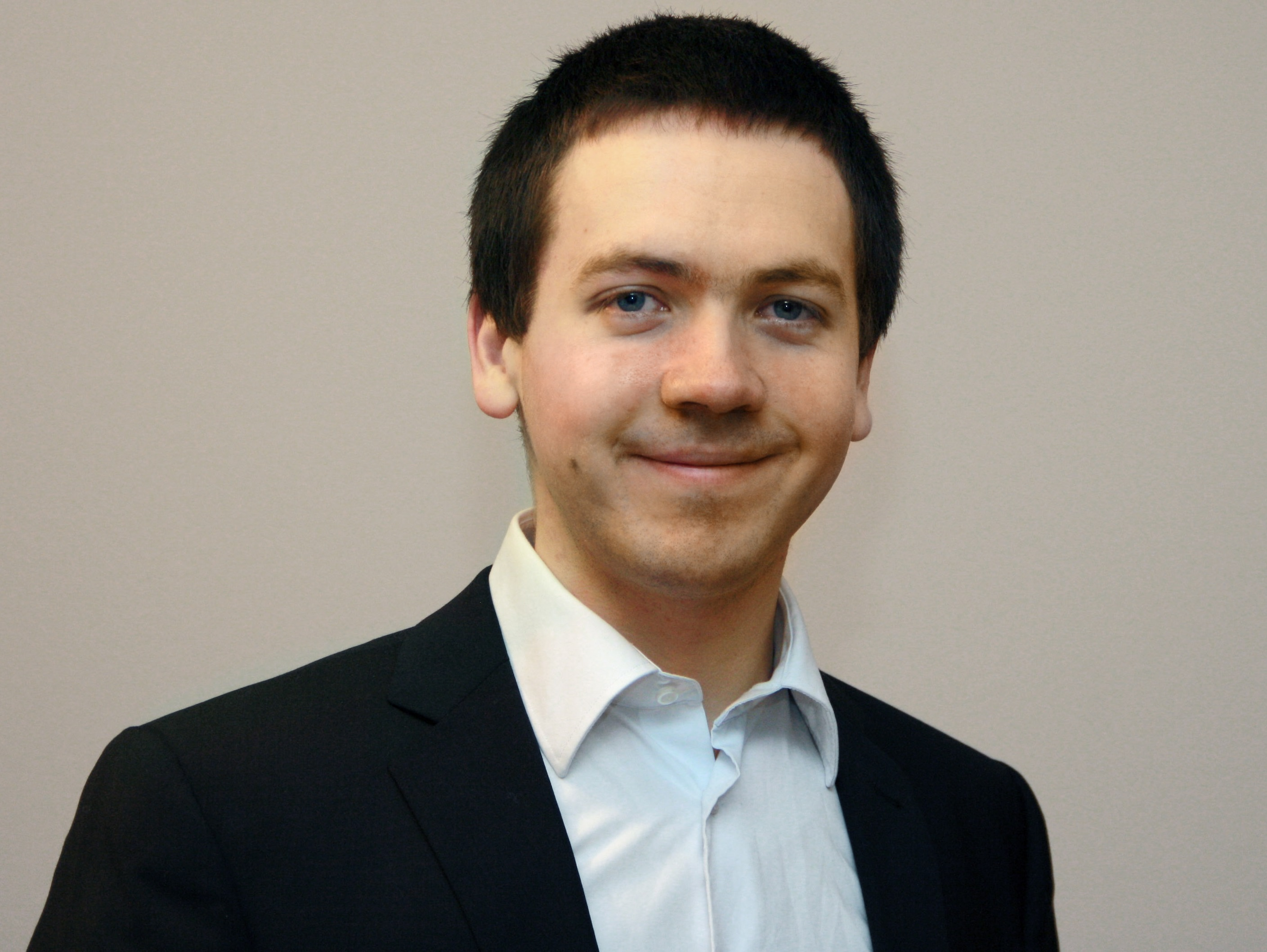
Brian Tomasik, author of the 2009 essay "The Importance of Wild-Animal Suffering"

In 2009, Brian Tomasik published "The Importance of Wild-Animal Suffering", arguing that wild animals greatly outnumber animals under direct human control and that animal advocates should give greater attention to their suffering. Jeff McMahan subsequently addressed the moral problem of predation in "The Meat Eaters".

In 2015, Relations. Beyond Anthropocentrism published a special issue devoted to wild animal suffering and intervention in nature, including a revised version of Tomasik's essay. Catia Faria argued in her doctoral thesis and subsequent book Animal Ethics in the Wild: Wild Animal Suffering and Intervention in Nature (2022) that humans have obligations to assist suffering wild animals. Kyle Johannsen's Wild Animal Ethics: The Moral and Political Problem of Wild Animal Suffering likewise argues for intervention to reduce wild animal suffering, and Johannsen later edited Positive Duties to Wild Animals.

==== Organizations and institutions ====
Organizations studying or advocating on the issue include Animal Ethics and Wild Animal Initiative. Wild Animal Initiative was formed in 2019 through the merger of Utility Farm and Wild-Animal Suffering Research. In September 2022, New York University launched a Wild Animal Welfare Program to study how human activity and environmental change affect the welfare of wild animals.

== Ethics of intervention ==
=== Animal ethics and environmental ethics ===
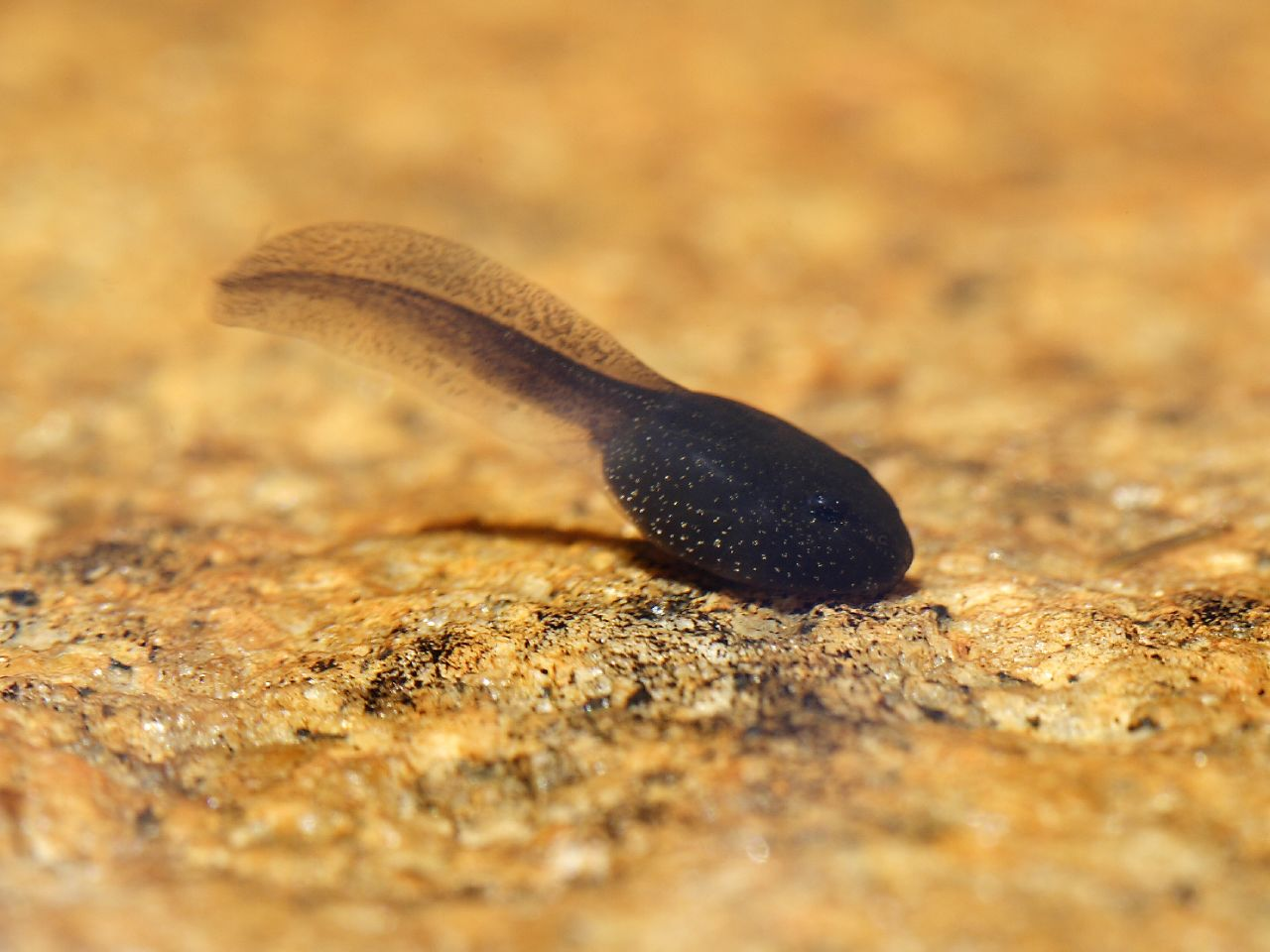
A tadpole; an individual animal. Many approaches in animal ethics focus on the welfare and interests of sentient individuals

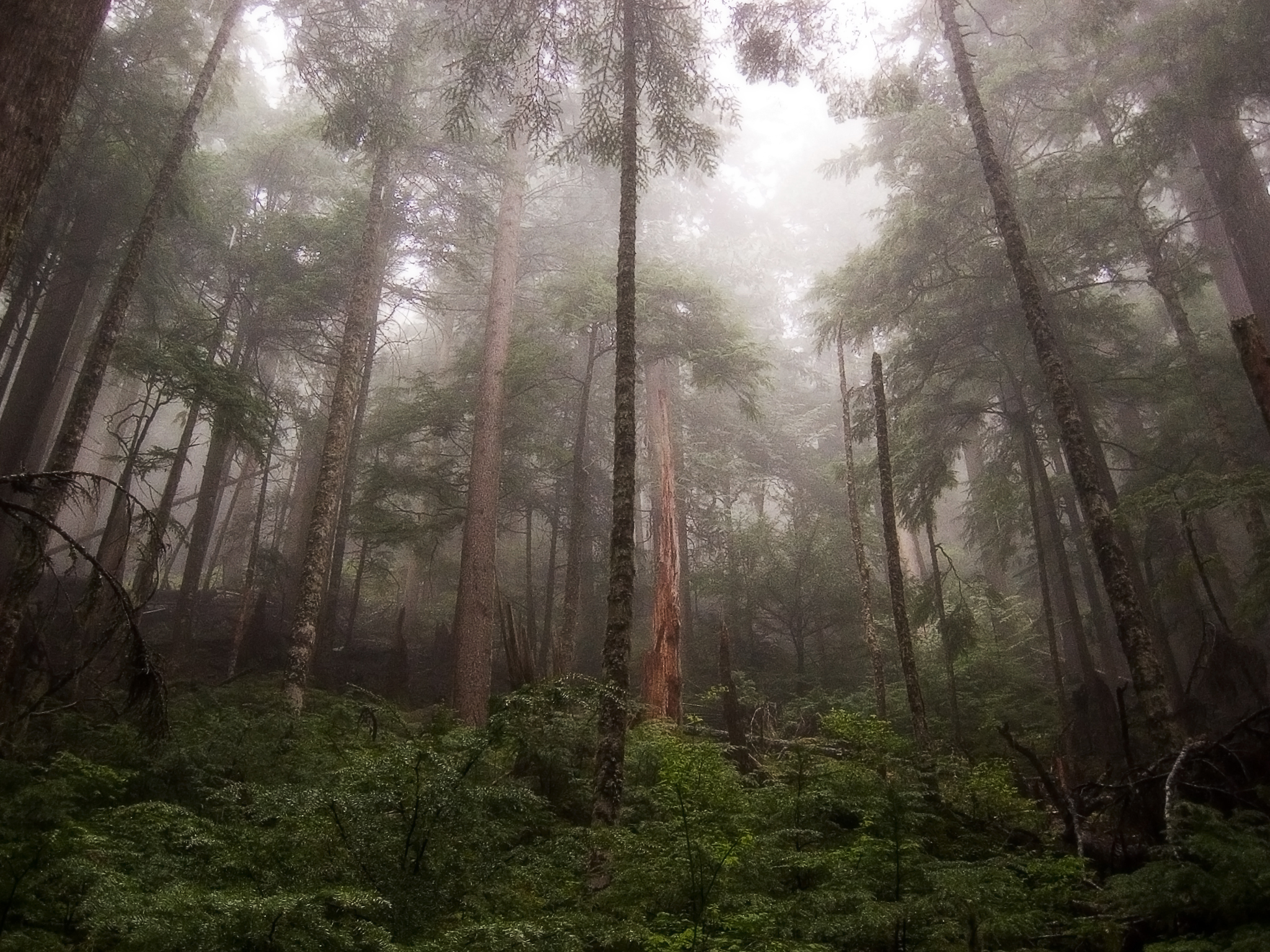
A rainforest; a biodiverse ecosystem. Some approaches in environmental ethics give moral weight to ecosystems and species

One disagreement between animal ethics and environmental ethics concerns what should receive moral consideration. Animal ethics generally focuses on the interests or welfare of individual animals, while environmental ethics may give moral weight to species, ecosystems, biodiversity, and natural processes. These priorities can conflict over practices including hunting as population management, predator reintroduction, possible modification of carnivores or r-selected species, and the preservation or reduction of habitats. Bob Fischer similarly argues that measures that benefit individual animals may conflict with goals such as species preservation, biodiversity, or climate protection.

Werner Scholtz argues that individual-centered animal rights can conflict with holistic environmental approaches. He proposes group-based rights for wild animals as a way of reconciling animal protection with biodiversity conservation, while arguing that such rights do not entail eliminating all natural suffering.

=== Predation as a moral problem ===
Predation has been used as a test case for the implications of animal ethics beyond human-caused harms. Some philosophers argue that duties to protect animals from serious harm may also apply when the threat comes from another animal. Others deny that preventing predation is required, warn that intervention could cause greater ecological harm, or use the issue to challenge theories of animal rights. Jeff McMahan argues that intervention against predation may not currently be advisable because of uncertainty about its effects, while maintaining that greater knowledge and technological capacity could alter this assessment.

=== Arguments for intervention ===
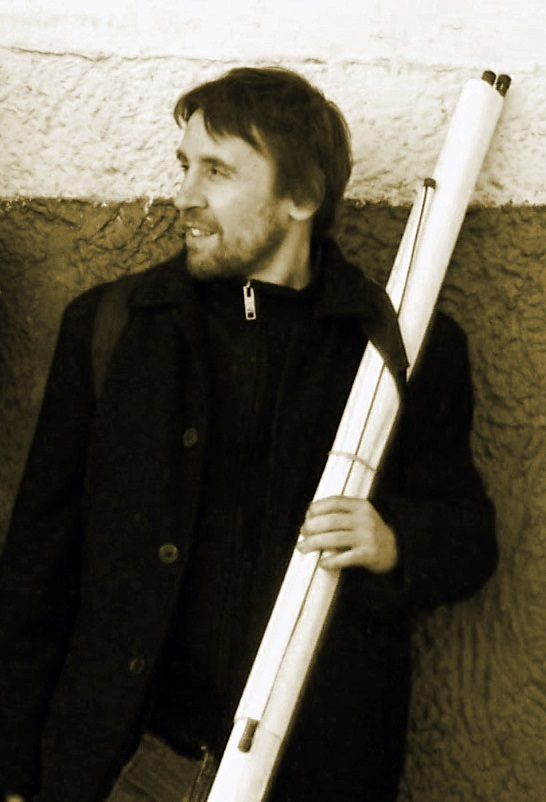
Oscar Horta argues that concern for wild animals should extend to suffering caused by natural processes and can support intervention to reduce it.

Arguments for intervention draw on both animal rights and welfare. Rights-based arguments hold that rights such as life or bodily integrity may provide reasons to protect animals from serious harms caused by other animals. Tom Regan, however, argues that non-human animals are not moral agents and therefore cannot violate one another's rights. Welfare-based arguments instead hold that intervention can be justified when it is expected to reduce suffering without causing greater harms.

Connor K. Kianpour and Eze Paez argue that several approaches to animal rights can permit large-scale modification of nature to improve wild animal welfare under some circumstances, even if those approaches do not establish a duty to undertake such interventions.

Other arguments concern consistency and impartiality. Catia Faria and Eze Paez argue that refusing assistance to wild animals while assisting humans in comparable circumstances can reflect speciesism. Jamie Mayerfeld argues that an impartial duty to relieve suffering extends to animals harmed by natural processes. Oscar Horta argues that humans already intervene extensively in nature for human and environmental purposes, and questions treating interventions aimed at helping wild animals differently.

Arguments based on human responsibility distinguish between harms caused or intensified by humans and harms arising independently of human activity. Martha Nussbaum argues that human effects on animal habitats generate responsibilities toward affected animals, while also suggesting that duties of assistance can extend to animals suffering from disease, natural disasters, and other natural causes. Jeff Sebo argues that wild animals experience both human-caused and natural harms, with some harms being increased by climate change. Steven Nadler argues that obligations to help individual wild animals need not depend on whether humans caused their suffering. Bob Fischer argues that caring relationships with wild animals can generate special responsibilities to assist them, discussing cases in which animals had become dependent on food provided by humans.

Faria has also developed a gender-sensitive account of wild animal ethics. She criticizes approaches that subordinate individual animals to ecological wholes or treat autonomy as requiring non-interference. Drawing on a relational account of autonomy, she argues that assistance can in some circumstances expand the options available to wild animals.

=== Arguments against intervention ===
==== Ecological uncertainty and unintended consequences ====
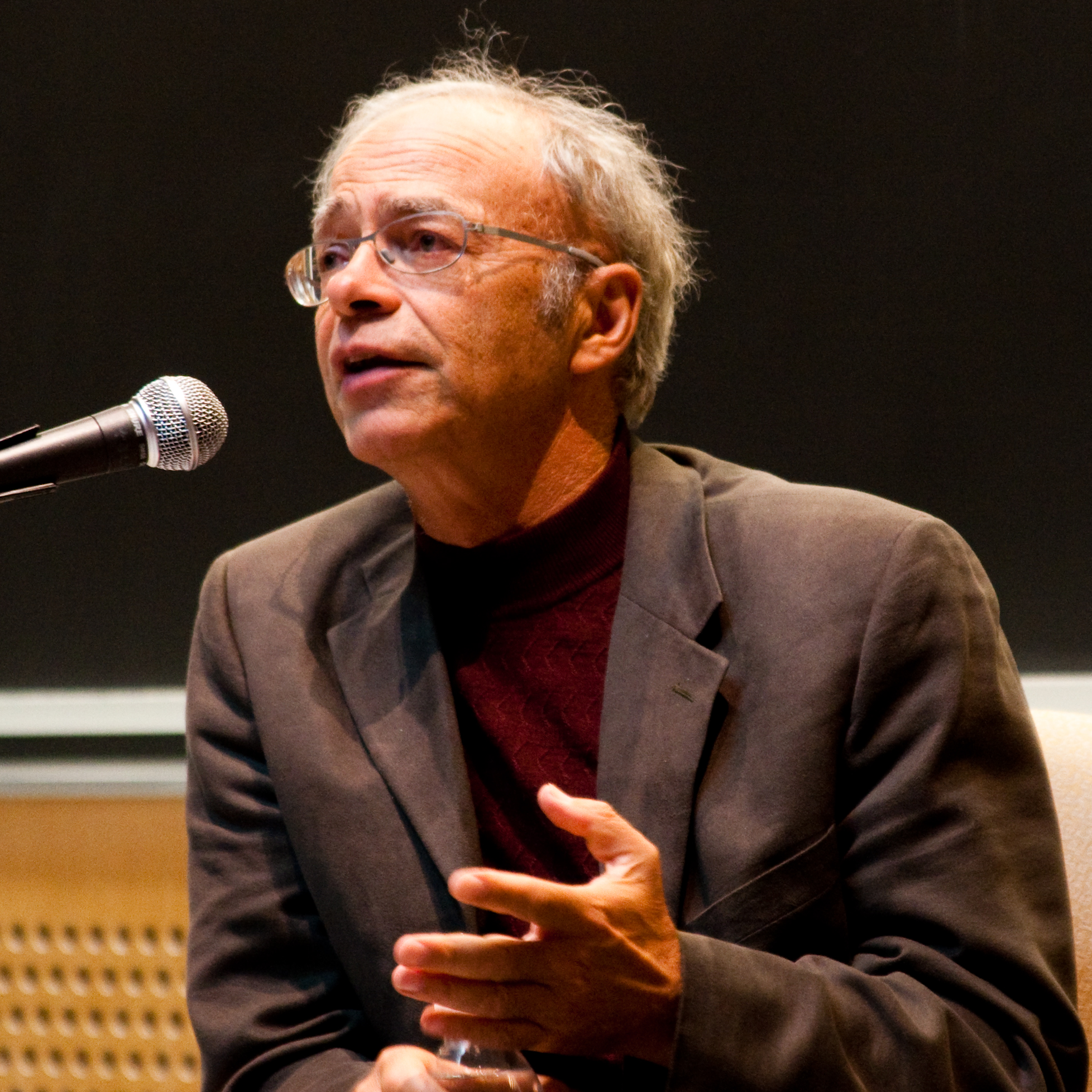
Peter Singer argues that intervention could be justified if it reduced suffering overall, but cautions that ecological intervention may cause greater harms.

A practical objection concerns the difficulty of predicting the effects of intervention in complex ecosystems. Aaron Simmons argues that interventions intended to save wild animals could damage ecosystems or cause greater numbers of animal deaths. Peter Singer argues that intervention would be justified if it could be expected to substantially reduce suffering and death in the long term, but cautions that interference with ecosystems may instead cause greater harm.

Critics have also raised concerns about human arrogance, playing God, and unforeseen consequences. Beril Sözmen responds that uncertainty does not establish that all interventions should be rejected, while Nussbaum argues that humans already intervene extensively in nature and that the relevant question is what forms of intervention are appropriate. Tyler Cowen similarly argues that, because humans already alter nature, ethical evaluation should concern which interventions are preferable, rather than whether intervention occurs at all. McMahan argues that human influence on nature can provide reason to favor changes expected to reduce suffering.

==== Value of natural processes and wildness ====
Some environmental ethicists give moral value to ecological processes, wilderness, or wildness independently of the welfare of individual animals. Holmes Rolston III argues that suffering can form part of ecologically valuable natural processes and that humans do not have a general duty to prevent suffering arising independently of human action. Rolston also defends predation in terms of the ecological roles of carnivores. Yves Bonnardel criticizes this approach, arguing that the concept of nature can function ideologically by treating animals as bearers of ecological functions rather than as individuals with interests.

==== Laissez-faire and limited duties ====
A laissez-faire position, defended in different forms by Regan, Elisa Aaltola, Clare Palmer, and Ned Hettinger, holds that humans have duties not to harm wild animals but do not have a general duty to protect them from naturally occurring harms. Faria argues that restricting duties of assistance to harms caused by humans would have implications for comparable cases involving humans and companion animals who suffer from natural causes.

==== Sovereignty and paternalism ====
Sue Donaldson and Will Kymlicka, in Zoopolis, argue against large-scale interventions intended to manage wild animal societies, on the grounds that wild animals should be treated as sovereign communities capable of self-government. Oscar Horta argues that many wild animal populations do not constitute political communities and that sovereignty, where applicable, has instrumental rather than intrinsic value.

Estiva Reus compares proposals to reform nature for the benefit of wild animals with colonial arguments that populations described as "backward" should be governed by those claiming superior knowledge and ability. Thomas Lepeltier rejects the analogy, arguing that colonialism involved domination, dispossession, and benefits to colonizers that are absent from proposals intended solely to assist suffering animals.

=== Explanations for non-intervention ===
Some advocates of intervention argue that attitudes toward wild animal suffering are influenced by assumptions about nature as predominantly beneficial or harmonious. Horta argues that romanticized views of nature can contribute to opposition to interventions intended to reduce suffering. Other writers have proposed that appeal to nature, status quo bias, scope neglect, omission bias, speciesism, anthropocentrism, doubts about feasibility, and limited attention to invertebrate welfare can contribute to the relative neglect of wild animal suffering.

== Relationship with conservation ==
A black-tailed prairie dog being released during a species translocation project in Colorado.

Conservation biology has traditionally prioritized species, populations, biodiversity, and ecological processes over the welfare of individual wild animals. Where conservation has addressed individual welfare, it has generally concerned harms associated with human activities, such as entanglement, pollution, habitat destruction, and disease outbreaks, rather than harms arising independently of human activity.

Compassionate conservation gives greater consideration to individual animals and seeks to avoid unnecessary harm in conservation practice. Its proponents generally retain biodiversity and ecological integrity as conservation goals, while treating animal welfare as a constraint on the methods used to pursue them.

An approach focused on reducing wild animal suffering instead treats the welfare of sentient individuals as a goal in its own right, including when suffering results from natural processes such as predation, disease, starvation, and competition. Advocates have therefore considered forms of ecosystem management intended primarily to improve animal welfare rather than to conserve species or ecosystems.

This proposal remains contested in conservation biology. Its proponents argue that conservation decisions should give greater weight to the welfare of individual sentient animals and that research could identify interventions capable of improving their welfare. Critics argue that making welfare an independent objective could conflict with biodiversity conservation, alter established conservation priorities, and involve ecological risks where the effects of intervention are difficult to predict.

== Interventions in practice ==
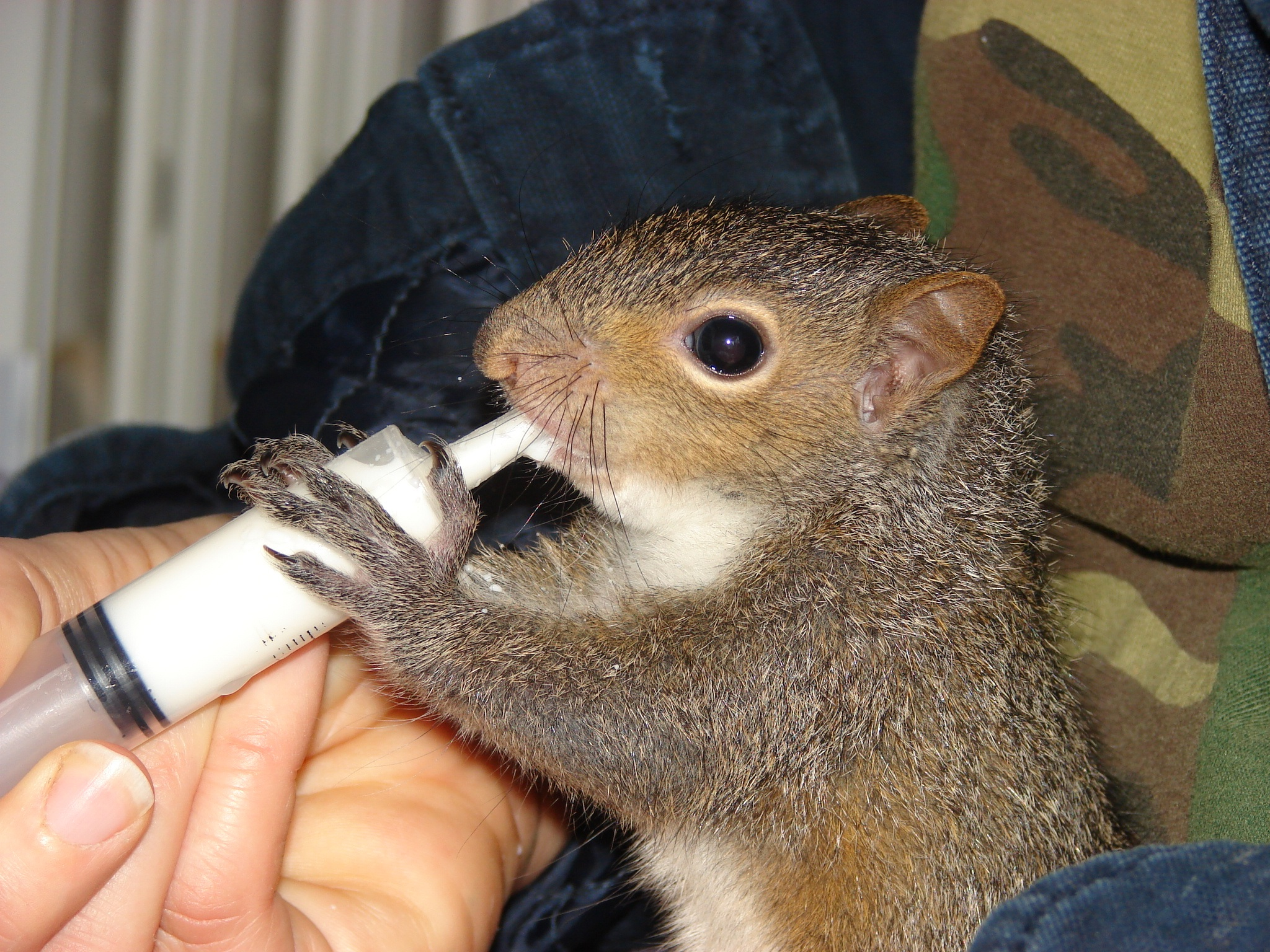
Rescued baby eastern gray squirrel being fed using a syringe

Existing forms of assistance to wild animals include medical treatment, vaccination, care for orphaned animals, rescue and disaster response, emergency provision of food, water or shelter, and contraception to manage populations.

=== Direct aid and rescue ===
Some communities have traditions of assisting wild animals. The Bishnoi, a Hindu sect founded in the fifteenth century, feed wild animals, and some Bishnoi temples operate rescue centres for injured animals. The Borana Oromo people leave water out overnight for wild animals because they regard them as having a right to drink.

Large-scale rescues have included Operation Breakthrough, in which the United States and Soviet governments attempted to free three gray whales trapped in ice off Alaska; the rescue of baby flamingos during drought in South Africa; wildlife rescues during the 2019–20 Australian bushfire season; and rescues of stranded whales, abandoned Cape cormorant chicks and cold-stunned sea turtles.

=== Disease and population management ===
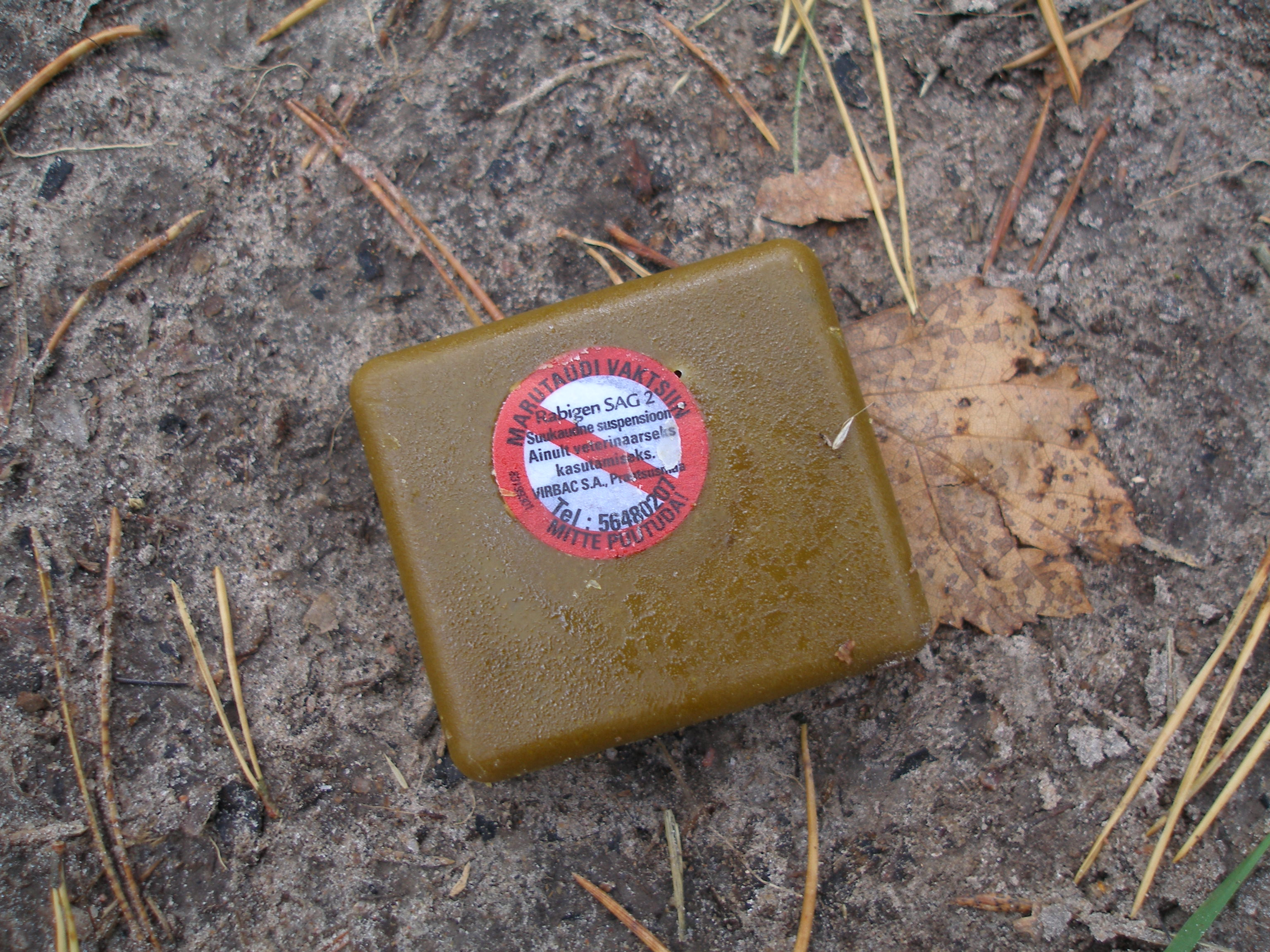
Oral rabies vaccine in bait

Vaccination programmes have been used to control rabies and tuberculosis in wild animal populations. Wildlife contraception has been used to reduce or stabilise populations of wild horses, white-tailed deer, American bison and African elephants.

Culling has sometimes been justified partly on animal-welfare grounds. In 2002, the Australian government authorised the killing of 15,000 kangaroos trapped within a fenced military base where animals were suffering from illness and starvation. In 2016, rangers at Kruger National Park killed starving hippos and buffaloes during a severe drought; preventing prolonged suffering was given as one reason for the measure.

A large-scale disease-control effort targeted the New World screwworm (Cochliomyia hominivorax) in North and Central America. Beginning in the 1950s, the United States Department of Agriculture used the sterile insect technique to release sterilised males and disrupt reproduction. The programme was designed principally to protect livestock, but the parasite also infested wild animals, and its eradication affected wild populations as well as livestock.

== Research and proposals ==
=== Welfare biology and wild animal welfare science ===
Yew-Kwang Ng proposed welfare biology in 1995, defining it as "the study of living things and their environment with respect to their welfare (defined as net happiness, or enjoyment minus suffering)". Catia Faria and Oscar Horta describe welfare biology as a field concerned with the welfare of animals in relation to natural ecosystems and with research that could inform ways of helping them.

A related field is wild animal welfare science. In 2026, Vittoria Elliott and colleagues described wild animal welfare science as an emerging interdisciplinary field that applies methods from animal welfare science, ecology, animal behaviour, and related disciplines to the welfare of wild animals.

=== Proposed interventions ===
Diagram of a gene drive. Gene drives have been proposed as a possible future means of altering reproductive patterns in some wild animal populations.

Some writers propose expanding existing forms of assistance where evidence suggests that doing so would reduce suffering without causing greater harm. Kyle Johannsen has proposed that, with sufficient research, CRISPR and gene drives could be used to alter reproductive patterns among animals with high juvenile mortality, while stressing that intervention should be constrained by uncertainty about ecological effects. Magnus Vinding has considered genetic and other forms of biological modification intended to reduce severe suffering, while comparing them with approaches intended to reduce future animal populations.

Some authors have also considered interventions aimed at reducing suffering from predation, including predator population management, avoiding some predator reintroductions, and hypothetical genetic modification of predatory behaviour.

Proposals concerning conservation practice include opposition to some forms of rewilding. Ole Martin Moen argues that rewilding can produce avoidable suffering, while Josh Milburn argues that preventing rewilding or implementing forms of "dewilding" may sometimes be preferable where wild animals depend on environments created by previous human activity.

Another argument concerns the amount of habitat available to wild animals. Brian Tomasik has argued from a consequentialist perspective that reducing habitat could reduce total suffering if the wild animals that would otherwise live there generally experienced more suffering than enjoyment. Tyler M. John and Jeff Sebo discuss and criticize this position under the label "Logic of the Logger".

== Future risks ==
Some authors have considered the possibility that human activity could spread wild animal suffering beyond Earth. Proposed scenarios include the creation of self-sustaining ecosystems on extraterrestrial colonies or terraformed planets. Gary David O'Brien has considered directed panspermia as another possibility, arguing that introduced microbial life could eventually evolve into sentient organisms capable of suffering.

== Cultural depictions ==
=== Wildlife documentaries ===
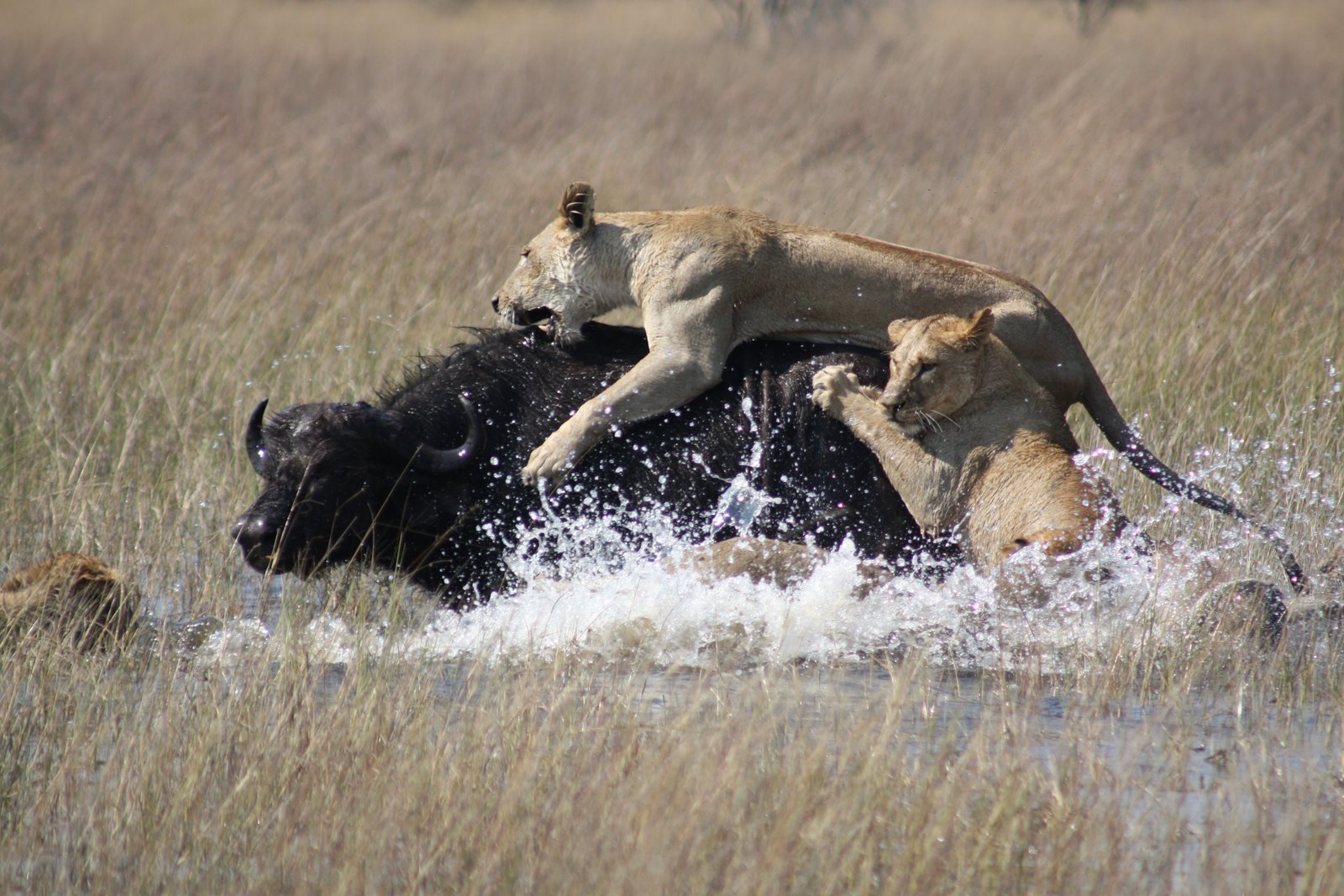
Lions attacking an African buffalo in Botswana, an example of predation of the kind depicted in wildlife documentaries.

Some writers argue that wildlife documentaries depict some forms of wild animal suffering more readily than others. Philipp Ryf argues that documentaries tend to focus on charismatic animals, adults, and visible predator-prey encounters, while giving less attention to small animals, invertebrates, young animals, disease, parasitism, and injuries following predator attacks. Ozy Brennan similarly argues that some sources of suffering among wild animals receive relatively little attention in representations of nature.

Toni Muñoz argues that wildlife documentaries commonly present nature as something to be observed and protected without intervention, and portray hardships as obstacles overcome through adaptation. David Pearce criticizes wildlife documentaries for aestheticizing animal suffering and presenting natural violence through narration, music, and narrative structures that make it more acceptable to viewers. Clare Palmer argues that depictions of wild animal suffering do not usually produce the same expectation of human assistance as comparable suffering among companion animals, which she associates with a laissez-faire view towards wild animals.

David Attenborough has stated that wildlife documentaries omit substantial amounts of violence during editing. Whether documentary filmmakers should intervene to assist suffering animals has also been debated. Non-intervention has been described as a convention of wildlife filmmaking, although filmmakers have sometimes intervened to rescue animals, including stranded penguins and baby turtles.

=== Literature ===
Illustration by Kurt Wiese from the 1928 English edition of Bambi, a Life in the Woods.

Historian of science Antonello La Vergata traces the use of "nature's war" and the "economy of nature" in Western accounts of death, destruction, and pain among living organisms. He traces these themes through natural history, philosophy, and literary and moral writing.

In his 1756 Poème sur le désastre de Lisbonne, Voltaire presents sentient beings as sharing a condition of suffering and describes a sequence in which predators themselves become prey. Jacques Marckert interprets the passage as a food chain in which each predator is a potential victim and as part of Voltaire's rejection of philosophical optimism. Erasmus Darwin's The Temple of Nature describes predation and competition among animals and characterizes the world as a "great Slaughter-house". Hernández-Avilez and Ruiz-Gutiérrez discuss the passage as an early depiction of the struggle for existence that later attracted the attention of Charles Darwin.

In Queen Mab (1813), Percy Bysshe Shelley imagines a transformed natural world in which predatory relations have disappeared. Robert Mitchell interprets the poem's transformed animals and landscapes as part of a broader vision in which humans reshape nature. In Giacomo Leopardi's Dialogo della Natura e di un Islandese ("Dialogue between Nature and an Icelander"), published in Operette morali (1827), a traveller confronts Nature about the suffering experienced by living beings. Stefan Pedatella interprets the dialogue's depictions of animal predation as representations of a cycle of destruction and regeneration that the traveller regards as without value.

In In Memoriam A.H.H. (1850), Alfred, Lord Tennyson questions nature's apparent indifference to individual life and the compatibility of natural violence with belief in a loving God. In section 56, he describes nature as "red in tooth and claw". Christopher Morgan interprets the passage as an expression of the conflict between the suffering of living beings and the belief that love governs creation. In Moby-Dick, Herman Melville depicts the sea as a place of continual predation, including what he describes as "universal cannibalism". Tennyson's Maud (1855) describes mayflies killed by swallows and sparrows killed by shrikes, presenting the surrounding woodland as a place of predation. Ryoichi Hashimoto interprets the passage as part of the speaker's reflections on suffering and the limits of individual agency. In Edwin Arnold's narrative poem The Light of Asia (1879), Prince Siddhartha observes lizards, snakes, birds, and other animals preying on one another. The poem describes this as "Life living upon death" and presents the observation as prompting Siddhartha to meditate on suffering.

In Bambi, a Life in the Woods, Felix Salten portrays predation and death as recurring features of animal life. Historian Ralph H. Lutts argues that the Disney adaptation reduced the roles of predation and starvation while presenting humans as the principal danger to the animals. In her essay "The Death of the Moth", published in 1942, Virginia Woolf describes watching a moth struggle and die, including her consideration of whether to intervene. Derek Ryan examines the essay as a depiction of an ethical encounter between a human and an animal. In R. S. Thomas's poem "January" (1955), an injured fox drags itself across snow. Christopher Morgan interprets the poem as a confrontation between the fox's suffering and a natural world offering neither pity nor relief.

Roberta Grandi describes Watership Down as immersing the reader in the natural history of rabbits, whose lives include continual encounters with predators as well as destructive human activity. Hollie Adams compares adaptations of Watership Down and The Animals of Farthing Wood, discussing their depictions of violence, death, displacement, and human effects on wild animals.

Annie Dillard's Pilgrim at Tinker Creek and Holy the Firm have been interpreted in relation to violence in nature. Joanna Smith argues that Dillard depicts nature through predation, parasitism, and death, and examines the relationship between these processes and divine presence. Robinson Jeffers also depicted violence and suffering in the natural world. Robert Zaller discusses poems including "Hurt Hawks" as part of Jeffers's engagement with the implications of a Darwinian conception of nature.

== See also ==
- Animal consciousness
- Animal welfare science
- God's utility function
- Moral circle expansion
- Natural evil
- Pain in animals
- Population ethics
- Suffering-focused ethics
- Wildlife management
