= Robert McKim (philosopher) =

Irish philosopher of religion (1952–2024)

Robert McKim (December 29, 1952 - June 27, 2024) was an Irish philosopher of religion. He was born in Collooney, Co. Sligo and attended Wesley College for his Secondary Education in Dublin. As a student he worked in London during summer vacations. He has degrees in philosophy from Trinity College Dublin and from the University of Calgary, and a Ph.D. in religious studies and philosophy from Yale University. He retired as Professor of Religion and Professor of Philosophy at the University of Illinois at Urbana–Champaign in 2018 and was subsequently awarded Emeritus status.

McKim has written extensively on the implications of religious diversity. In Religious Ambiguity and Religious Diversity (Oxford, 2001) McKim appeals to the twin realities of religious ambiguity and religious diversity in making a case for a self-critical, open, and tentative approach to religious belief. In On Religious Diversity (Oxford, 2011) he tackles the controversial issue of how religious traditions, and their members, ought to look on outsiders, their views, and their salvific prospects.

== Selected bibliography ==
- Religious Ambiguity and Religious Diversity (Oxford University Press, 2001)
- On Religious Diversity (Oxford University Press, 2011)
