= Bernard Rollin =

American philosopher (1943–2021)

- Born: Bernard Elliot Rollin; February 18, 1943; Brooklyn, New York City, New York, U.S.
- Died: November 19, 2021 (aged 78); Fort Collins, Colorado, U.S.
- Spouse: Linda Rollin (m. 1964)
- Children: 1
- Awards: Lifetime Achievement Award for Excellence in Research Ethics from Public Responsibility in Medicine and Research

Education
- Education: City College of New York (B.A. in philosophy, 1964); Columbia University (Ph.D. in philosophy, 1972)

Philosophical work
- Era: Contemporary philosophy
- Institutions: Colorado State University
- Main interests: Animal ethics, bioethics, philosophy of mind
- Website: www.libarts.colostate.edu/people/brollin/

Bernard Elliot Rollin (February 18, 1943 – November 19, 2021) was an American philosopher, who was emeritus professor of philosophy, animal sciences, and biomedical sciences at Colorado State University. He is considered the "father of veterinary medical ethics".

== Biography ==
=== Early life and education ===
Bernard Elliot Rollin was born in Brooklyn, New York, in 1943. He received a B.A. in philosophy from the City College of New York in 1964, and a Ph.D. in philosophy from Columbia University in 1972. Rollin met his future wife Linda while studying at the City College of New York; they married in 1964 and had one son.

=== Career ===
In 1969, Rollin joined Colorado State University's department of philosophy. Rollin specialized in animal rights and the philosophy of consciousness, and was the author of a number of influential books in the field.

Rollin's first books, which were among the first ones about animal ethics at the time, included Animal Rights and Human Morality (1981), published two years before Tom Regan's The Case for Animal Rights, and The Unheeded Cry: Animal Consciousness, Animal Pain and Scientific Change (1988). He also published Farm Animal Welfare (1995), and Science and Ethics (2006). He also co-edited the two-volume, The Experimental Animal in Biomedical Research (1989 and 1995). He published his memoir in 2011, Putting the Horse Before Descartes.

Rollin was featured in the film about speciesism, The Superior Human?, in which he analyzed the ideology of René Descartes to help show that animals can think and feel. He helped draft the 1985 amendments to the Animal Welfare Act of 1966. In 2016, he received a Lifetime Achievement Award for Excellence in Research Ethics from Public Responsibility in Medicine and Research.

Rollin was a member of the Scientific Expert Advisory Council (SEAC), for Australian animal welfare group Voiceless, the animal protection institute. SEAC is a group of academics from around the world who assist Voiceless in the production of quality research and publications which expose legalized animal cruelty and inform public debate. He was also a board member of Farm Forward, a 501(c)(3) organization that implements innovative strategies to promote conscientious food choices, reduce farmed animal suffering, and advance sustainable agriculture.

In 2019, Rollin celebrated 50 years at Colorado State University. He and his wife Linda, a fellow professor in philosophy at Colorado State University, retired in December 2020.

=== Death ===
Rollin died in Fort Collins, Colorado, on November 19, 2021, at the age of 78.

== Books ==
- Natural and conventional meaning: An examination of the distinction. Mouton. 1976. ISBN 90-279-3274-3.
- Animal Rights & Human Morality. Prometheus Books. 1981. ISBN 1-59102-421-8.
- The Teaching of Responsibility. Universities Federation for Animal Welfare (UFAW). 1983. ISBN 0-900767-33-2.
- with M. Lynne Kesel (eds.). The Experimental Animal in Biomedical Research: A Survey of Scientific and Ethical Issues for Investigators, Volume I. CRC Press (1989). ISBN 0-8493-4981-8
- Farm Animal Welfare: School, Bioethical, and Research Issues. Iowa State Press. 1995. ISBN 0-8138-2563-6.
- The Frankenstein Syndrome: Ethical and Social Issues in the Genetic Engineering of Animals. Cambridge University Press. 1995. ISBN 0-521-47807-3.
- The Unheeded Cry (1 ed.). Wiley. 1999. ISBN 0-8138-2575-X.
- with David W. Ramey. Complementary and Alternative Veterinary Medicine Considered. Wiley-Blackwell (2003). ISBN 0-8138-2616-0.
- with G. John Benson. The Well-Being of Farm Animals: Challenges and Solutions. Wiley-Blackwell (2003). ISBN 0-8138-0473-6
- Science and Ethics. Cambridge University Press. 2006. ISBN 0-521-67418-2.
- An Introduction to Veterinary Medical Ethics: Theory And Cases, Second Edition (2 ed.). Wiley-Blackwell. 2006. ISBN 0-8138-0399-3.
- Putting the Horse before Descartes: My Life's Work on Behalf of Animals . Temple University Press (2011). ISBN 978-1592138258

== See also ==
- List of animal rights advocates
