= Wildlife =

Undomesticated organisms

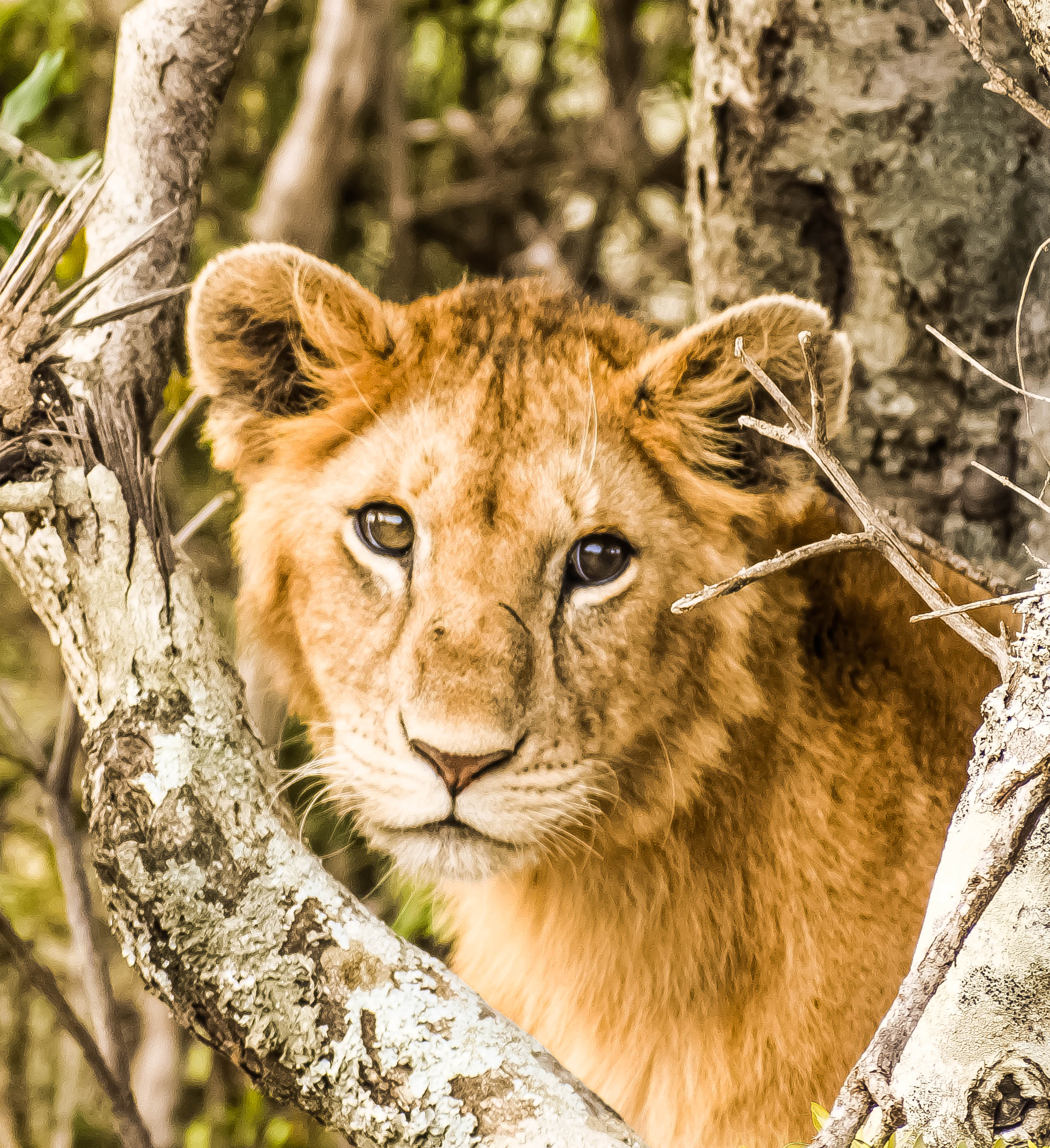
A lion (Panthera leo). Lions are an example of charismatic megafauna, a group of wildlife species that are especially popular in human culture.

Wildlife refers to undomesticated animals and uncultivated plant species which can exist in their natural habitat, but has come to include all organisms that grow or live wild in an area without being introduced by humans. Wildlife was also synonymous to game, birds and mammals hunted for sport. Wildlife can be found in all ecosystems, both wild and most developed urban areas, forming distinct groups. While the term in popular culture usually refers to animals that are untouched by human existence, most scientists agree that much wildlife is affected by humans. Some wildlife threaten human safety, health, property and quality of life, but many wild animals have value to humans, whether economic, educational, or sentimental.

Humans have historically tended to separate civilization from wildlife in a number of ways, including the legal, social and moral senses. Some animals, however, have adapted to suburban environments. This includes urban wildlife such as feral cats, dogs, mice, and rats. Some religions declare certain animals to be sacred, and in modern times, concern for the natural environment has provoked activists to protest against the exploitation of wildlife for human benefit or entertainment.

The annual international trade may be worth billions of dollars and affects hundreds of millions of individual specimens. Global wildlife populations have decreased significantly, by 68% since 1970, as a result of human activity, with identified causes including overconsumption, population growth, and intensive farming. This is cited as evidence that humans have unleashed a sixth mass extinction event.

== Definition ==
Wildlife refers to undomesticated animals and uncultivated plant species which can exist in their natural habitat, but has come to include all organisms that grow or live wild in an area without being introduced by humans. Wildlife was also synonymous to game, birds and mammals hunted for sport. Wildlife can be found in all ecosystems. Deserts, plains, grasslands, woodlands, forests, and other areas including the most developed urban areas, all have distinct forms of wildlife. While the term in popular culture usually refers to animals that are untouched by human behavior, most scientists agree that much wildlife is affected by it.

Humans have historically tended to separate civilization from wildlife in a number of ways, including the legal, social and moral senses. Some animals, however, have adapted to suburban environments. This includes urban wildlife such as feral cats, dogs, mice, and rats. Some religions declare certain animals to be sacred, and in modern times, concern for the natural environment has provoked activists to protest against the exploitation of wildlife for human benefit or entertainment.

Different countries have various legal definitions.

== Interactions with humans ==
=== Trade ===
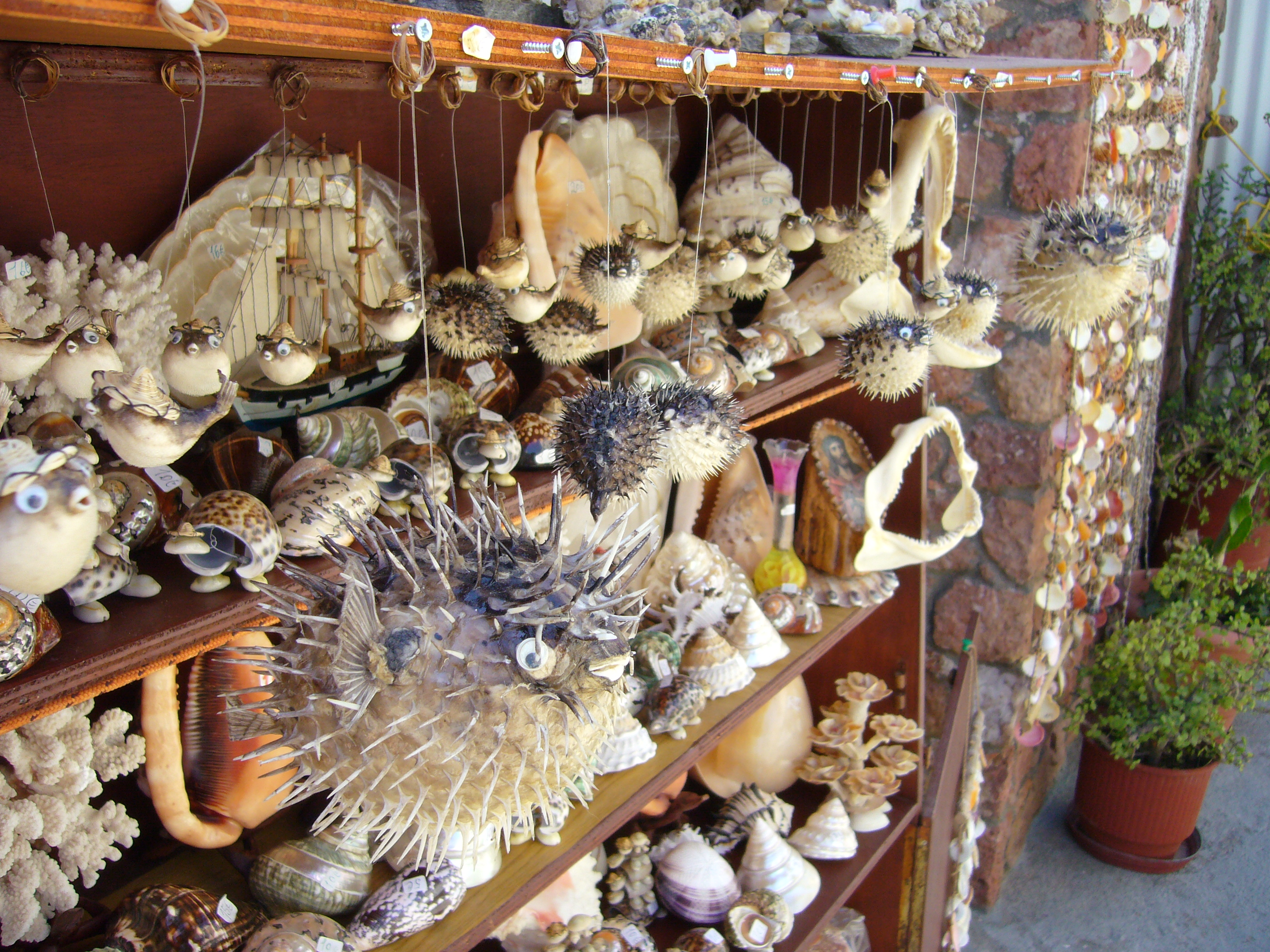
Assorted seashells, coral, shark jaws and dried blowfish on sale in Greece

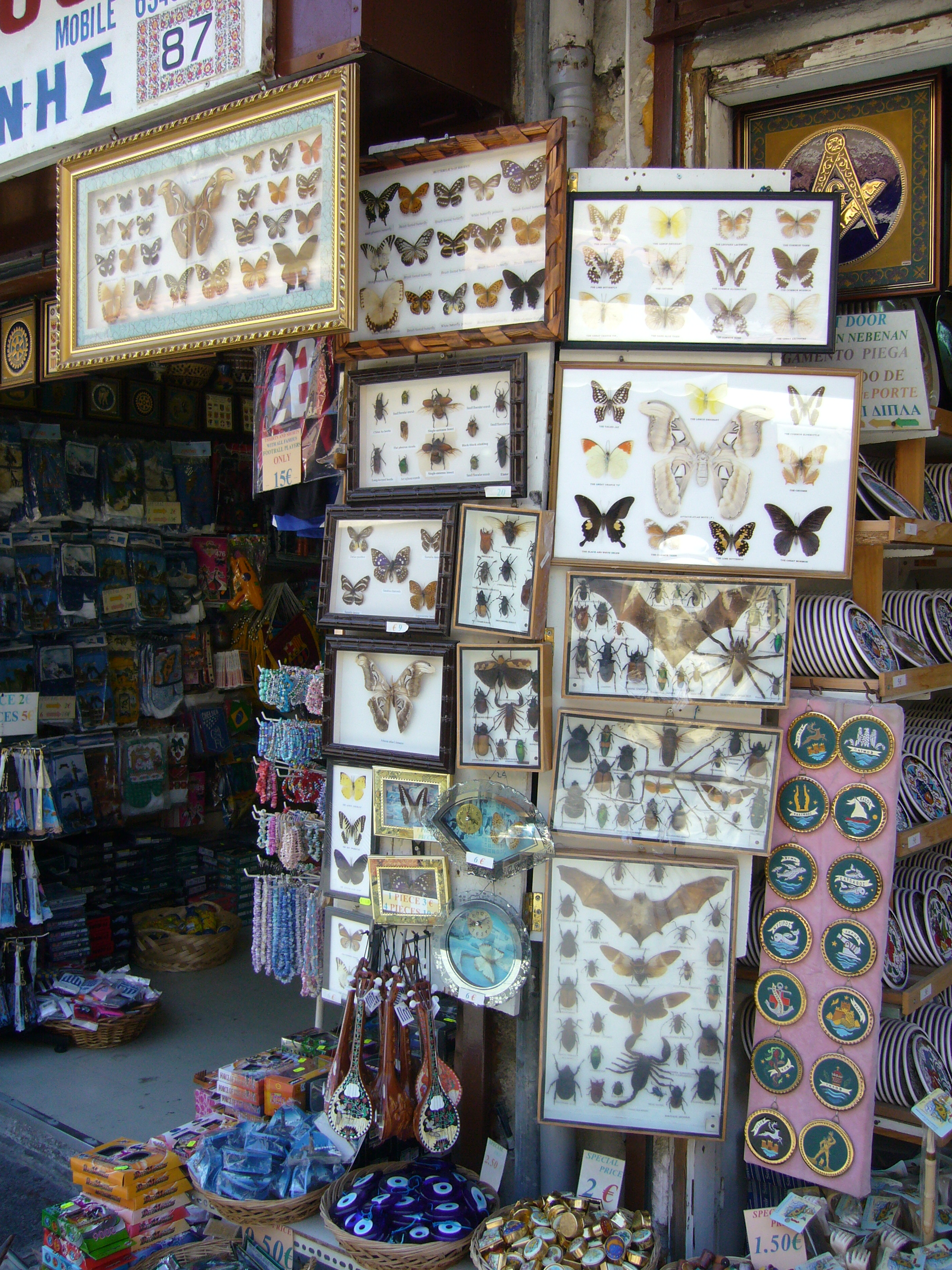
Framed butterflies, moths, beetles, bats, Emperor scorpions and tarantula spiders on sale in Rhodes, Greece

Wildlife trade refers to the exchange of products derived from non-domesticated animals or plants usually extracted from their natural environment or raised under controlled conditions. It can involve the trade of living or dead individuals, tissues such as skins, bones or meat, or other products. Legal wildlife trade is regulated by the United Nations' Convention on International Trade in Endangered Species of Wild Fauna and Flora (CITES), which currently has 184 member countries called Parties. Illegal wildlife trade is widespread and constitutes one of the major illegal economic activities, comparable to the traffic of drugs and weapons.

Wildlife trade is a serious conservation problem, has a negative effect on the viability of many wildlife populations and is one of the major threats to the survival of vertebrate species. The illegal wildlife trade has been linked to the emergence and spread of new infectious diseases in humans, including emergent viruses. Global initiatives like the United Nations Sustainable Development Goal 15 have a target to end the illegal supply of wildlife.

Despite various regional legal definitions for "wildlife", according to CITES, the annual international wildlife trade is likely worth billions of dollars and affects hundreds of millions of individual animals and plants.

==== For food ====
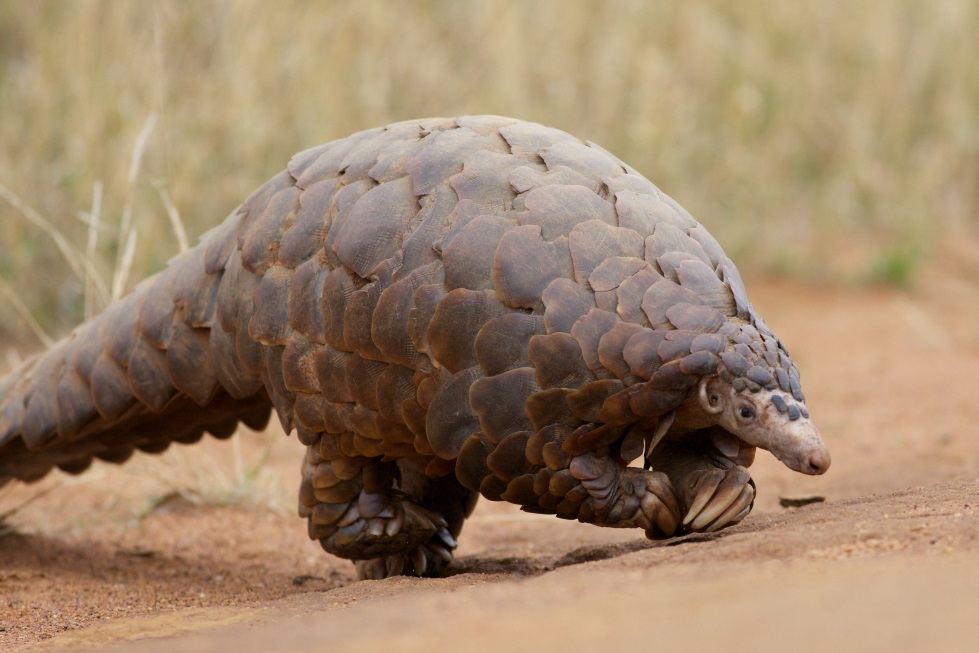
A ground pangolin

Stone Age people and hunter-gatherers relied on wildlife, both plants and animals, for their food. In fact, some species may have been hunted to extinction by early human hunters. Today, hunting, fishing, and gathering wildlife is still a significant food source in some parts of the world. In other areas, hunting and non-commercial fishing are mainly seen as a sport or recreation. Meat sourced from wildlife that is not traditionally regarded as game is known as bushmeat. The increasing demand for wildlife as a source of traditional food in East Asia is decimating populations of sharks, primates, pangolins and other animals, which they believe have aphrodisiac properties.

Malaysia is home to a vast array of amazing wildlife. However, illegal hunting and trade poses a threat to Malaysia's natural diversity.

— Chris S. Shepherd

Many Amazon species, including peccaries, agoutis, turtles, turtle eggs, anacondas, armadillos are sold primarily as food.

=== Media ===
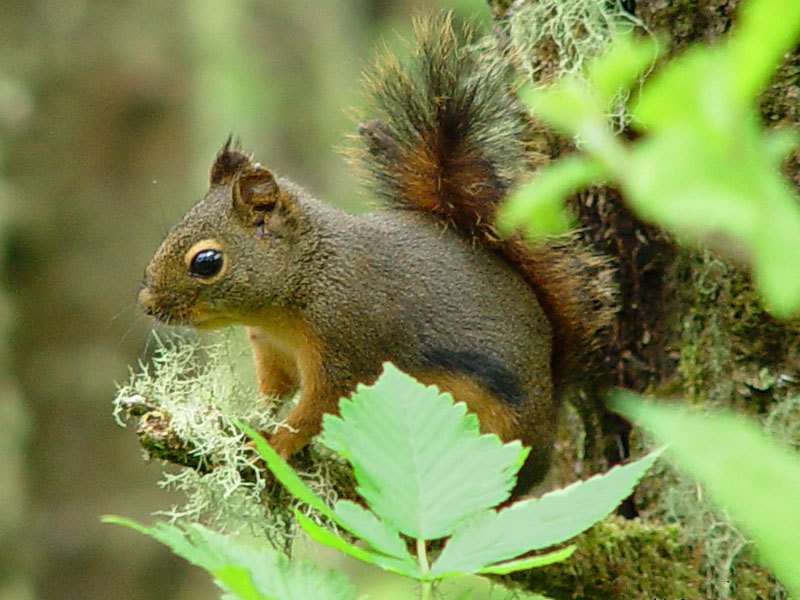
A Douglas squirrel (Tamiasciurus douglasii)

Wildlife has long been a common subject for educational television shows. National Geographic Society specials appeared on CBS since 1965, later moving to American Broadcasting Company and then Public Broadcasting Service. In 1963, NBC debuted Wild Kingdom, a popular program featuring zoologist Marlin Perkins as host. The BBC natural history unit in the United Kingdom was a similar pioneer, the first wildlife series LOOK presented by Sir Peter Scott, was a studio-based show, with filmed inserts. David Attenborough first made his appearance in this series, which was followed by the series Zoo Quest during which he and cameraman Charles Lagus went to many exotic places looking for and filming elusive wildlife—notably the Komodo dragon in Indonesia and lemurs in Madagascar. Since 1984, the Discovery Channel and its spinoff Animal Planet in the US have dominated the market for shows about wildlife on cable television, while on Public Broadcasting Service the NATURE strand made by WNET-13 in New York and NOVA by WGBH in Boston are notable. Wildlife television is now a multimillion-dollar industry with specialist documentary film-makers in many countries including UK, US, New Zealand, Australia, Austria, Germany, Japan, and Canada. There are many magazines and websites which cover wildlife including National Wildlife, Birds & Blooms, Birding, wildlife.net, and Ranger Rick for children.

=== Religion ===
Many animal species have spiritual significance in different cultures around the world, and they and their products may be used as sacred objects in religious rituals. For example, eagles, hawks and their feathers have great cultural and spiritual value to Native Americans as religious objects. In Hinduism the cow is regarded as sacred.

Muslims conduct sacrifices on Eid al-Adha, to commemorate the sacrificial spirit of Ibrāhīm in Islam ( Arabic-Abraham) in love of God. Camels, sheep, goats may be offered as sacrifice during the three days of Eid.

In Christianity the Bible has a variety of animal symbols, the Lamb is a famous title of Jesus. In the New Testament the Gospels Mark, Luke and John have animal symbols: "Mark is a lion, Luke is a bull and John is an eagle."

=== Tourism ===
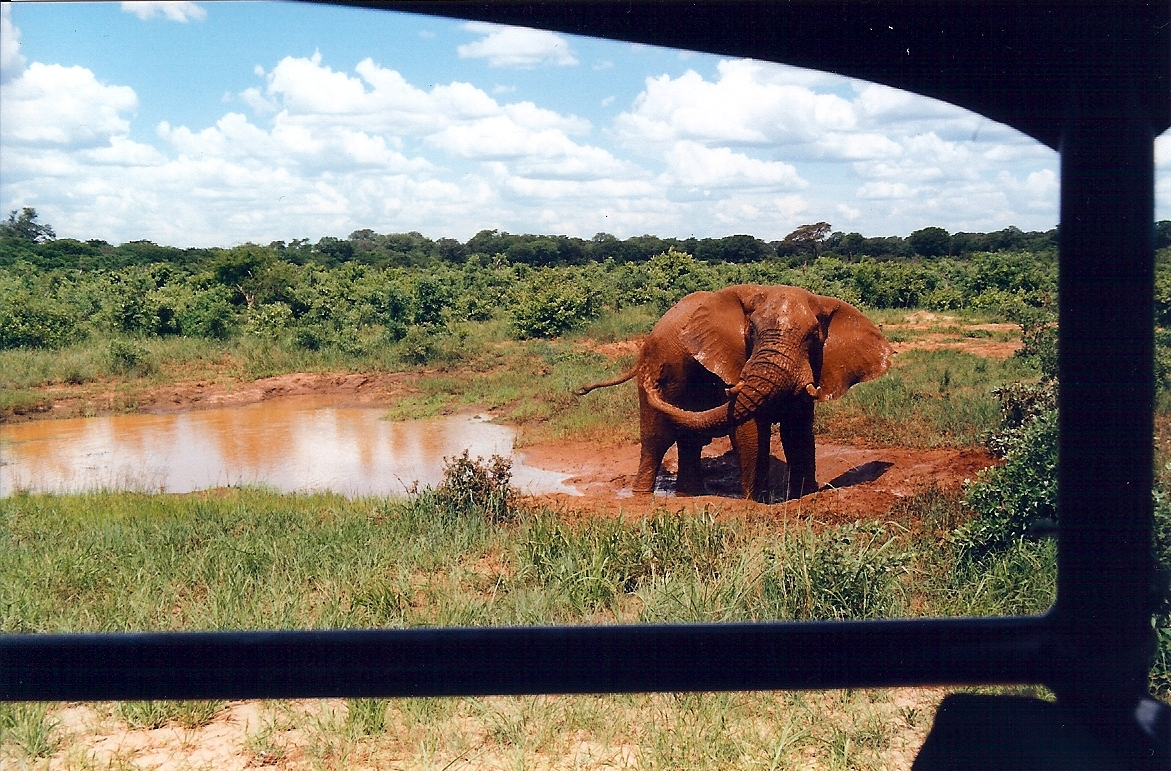
Animals can be viewed in their native or similar environments, from vehicles or on foot. This elephant in Hwange National Park, Zimbabwe, was quite undisturbed by the people and vehicle.

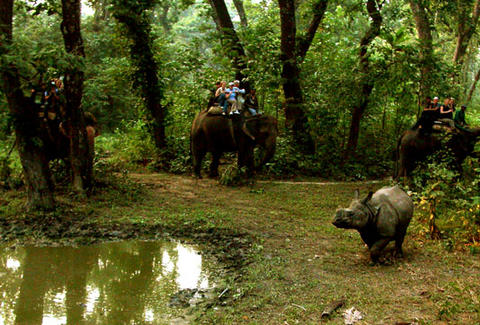
Elephant-mounted safari to view one-horned rhinoceros in Chitwan National Park, Nepal

Wildlife tourism is an element of many nations' travel industry centered around observation and interaction with local animal and plant life in their natural habitats. While it can include eco- and animal-friendly tourism, safari hunting and similar high-intervention activities also fall under the umbrella of wildlife tourism. Wildlife tourism, in its simplest sense, is interacting with wild animals in their natural habitat, either actively (e.g. hunting/collection) or passively (e.g. watching/photography). Wildlife tourism is an important part of the tourism industries in many countries including many African and South American countries, Australia, India, Canada, Indonesia, Bangladesh, Malaysia, Sri Lanka and Maldives among many. It has experienced a dramatic and rapid growth in recent years worldwide and many elements are closely aligned to eco-tourism and sustainable tourism.

According to United Nations World Tourism Organization, with an annual growth about 3%, 7% of world tourism industry relates to wildlife tourism. They also estimate that the growth is much more significant in places like UNESCO World Heritage Sites. Wildlife tourism currently employs 22 million people worldwide directly or indirectly, and contributes more than $120 billion to global GDP. As a multimillion-dollar international industry, wildlife tourism is often characterized by the offering of customized tour packages and safaris to allow close access to wildlife.

== Suffering ==
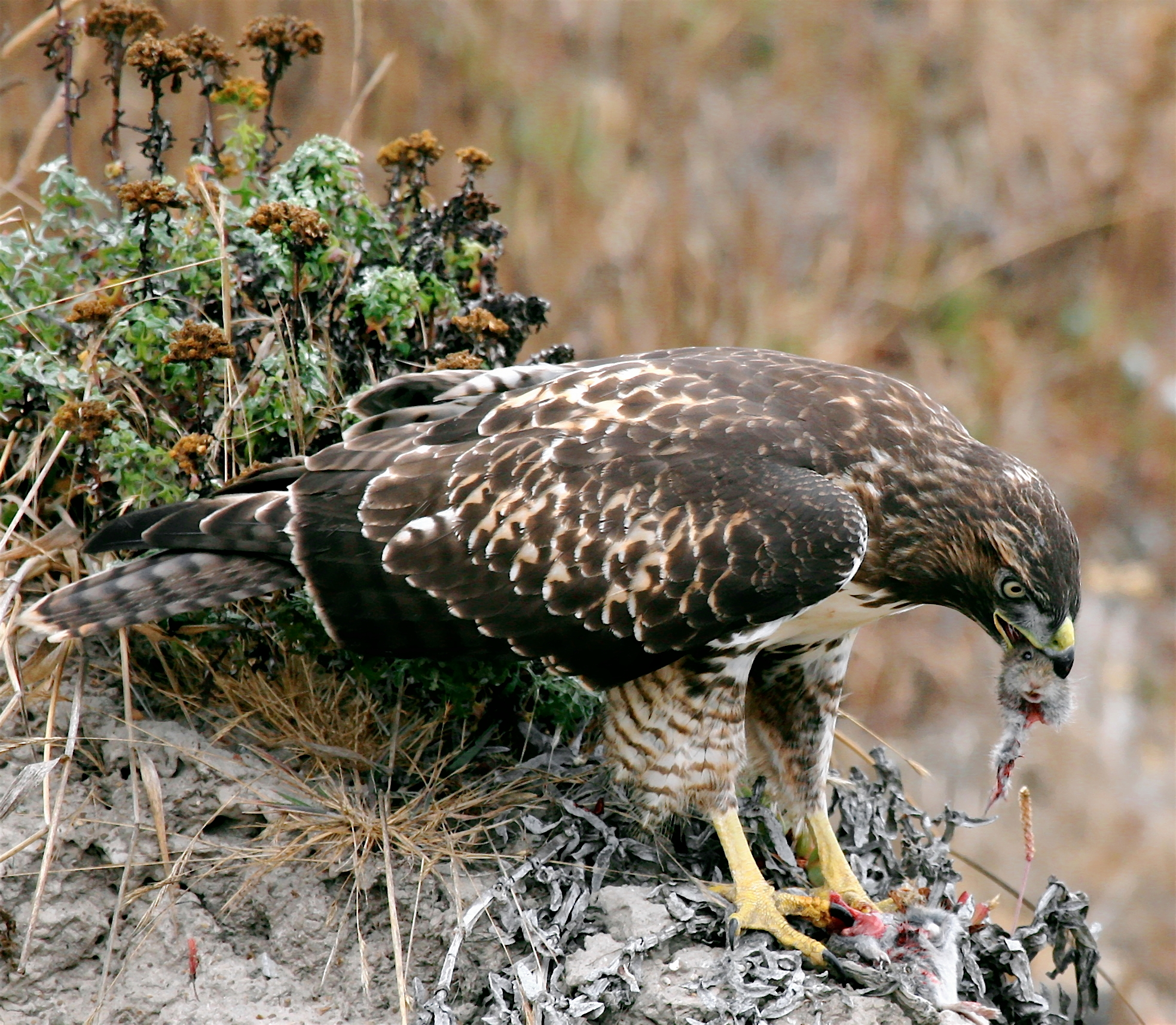
A juvenile red-tailed hawk feeding on a California vole

Wild animal suffering refers to the suffering experienced by wild animals from causes such as disease, injury, parasitism, starvation, dehydration, extreme weather, natural disasters, predation, and psychological stress. The subject encompasses the extent and severity of these harms, their moral significance, and whether humans have obligations to prevent or alleviate them.

The extent of suffering among wild animals is difficult to determine. Some writers argue that natural selection, high reproductive rates, and high juvenile mortality expose large numbers of animals to suffering and early death. Others caution that mortality and population dynamics alone cannot establish whether wild animals generally experience more suffering than well-being.

Suffering among wild animals has been discussed in theology, philosophy, and literature, particularly in relation to the problem of evil, predation, and the struggle for existence. Nineteenth-century writers including Lewis Gompertz and Charles Darwin examined suffering arising from natural processes. Since the late twentieth century, philosophers including Peter Singer, Steve F. Sapontzis, Oscar Horta, and Catia Faria have examined whether humans have obligations to alleviate such suffering. The subject has also developed as an area of research on wild animal welfare, following Yew-Kwang Ng's proposal for welfare biology in 1995.

A central ethical question is whether humans should intervene to reduce suffering caused by natural processes. Supporters of intervention appeal to animal welfare, animal rights, and opposition to speciesism; critics raise concerns about ecological consequences, the value of wildness, and the autonomy of wild animals. Existing forms of assistance include wildlife rescue, vaccination, and emergency provision of food or water. More extensive proposals involve changes to wildlife management or the use of new technologies. Related debates concern conservation welfare and rewilding.

== Loss and extinction ==
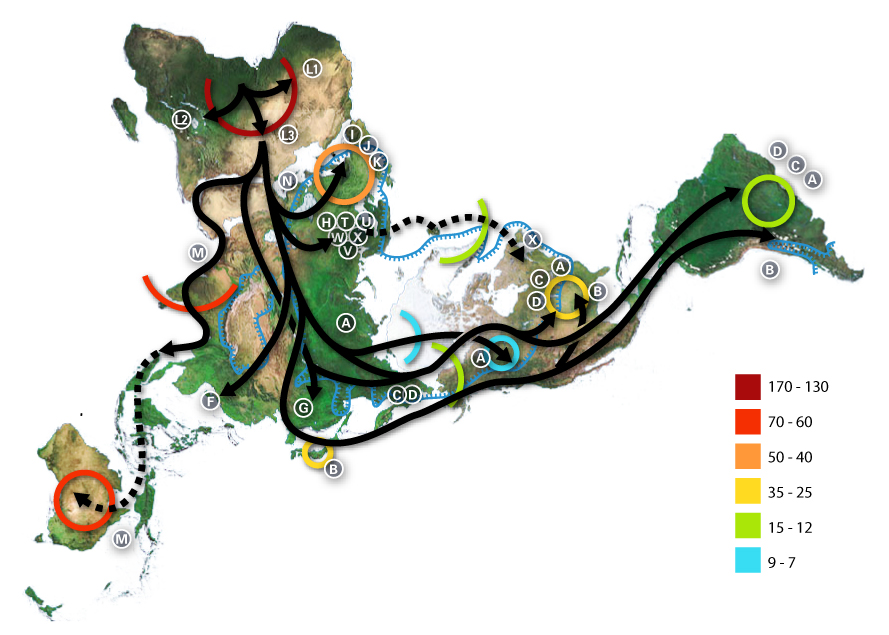
Map of early human migrations according to mitochondrial population genetics (millennia BP)

This subsection focuses on anthropogenic forms of wildlife destruction. The loss of animals from ecological communities is also known as defaunation.

Exploitation of wild populations has been a characteristic of humanity since its exodus from Africa 130,000–70,000 years ago. The rate of extinctions of entire species of plants and animals across the planet has been so high in the last few hundred years that it is widely believed that a sixth mass extinction event is currently ongoing. The 2019 Global Assessment Report on Biodiversity and Ecosystem Services, published by the United Nations' Intergovernmental Science-Policy Platform on Biodiversity and Ecosystem Services, says that roughly one million species of plants and animals face extinction within decades as the result of human actions. Subsequent studies have discovered that the destruction of wildlife is "significantly more alarming" than previously believed, with some 48% of 70,000 monitored animal species experiencing population declines as the result of human industrialization. According to a 2023 study published in PNAS, "immediate political, economic, and social efforts of an unprecedented scale are essential if we are to prevent these extinctions and their societal impacts."

Global wildlife populations have decreased significantly by 68% since 1970 as a result of human activity, particularly overconsumption, population growth, and intensive farming, according to a 2020 World Wildlife Fund's Living Planet Report and the Zoological Society of London's Living Planet Index measure, which is further evidence that humans have unleashed a sixth mass extinction event.

The four most general reasons that lead to destruction of wildlife include overkill, habitat destruction and fragmentation, impact of introduced species and chains of extinction.

=== Overkill ===
Overkill happens whenever hunting occurs at rates greater than the reproductive capacity of the population is being exploited. The effects of this are often noticed much more dramatically in slow-growing populations such as many larger species of fish. Initially when a portion of a wild population is hunted, an increased availability of resources (food, etc.) is experienced increasing growth and reproduction as density dependent inhibition is lowered. Hunting, fishing and so on, have lowered the competition between members of a population. However, if this hunting continues at rate greater than the rate at which new members of the population can reach breeding age and produce more young, the population will begin to decrease in numbers.

Populations that are confined to islands, whether literal islands or just areas of habitat that are effectively an "island" for the species concerned, have also been observed to be at greater risk of dramatic population rise of deaths declines following unsustainable hunting.

=== Habitat destruction and fragmentation ===
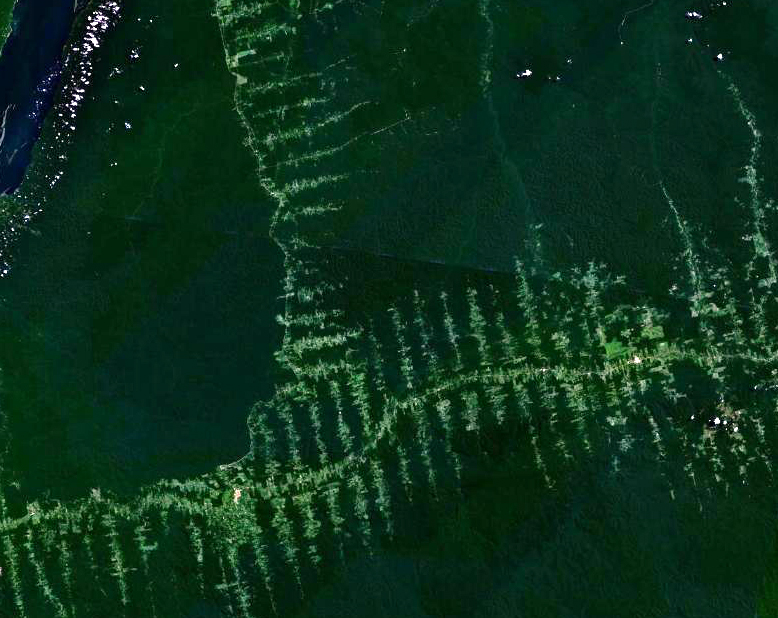
Deforestation and increased road-building in the Amazon rainforest are a significant concern because of increased human encroachment upon wild areas, increased resource extraction and further threats to biodiversity.

The habitat of any given species is considered its preferred area or territory. Many processes associated with human habitation of an area cause loss of this area and decrease the carrying capacity of the land for that species. In many cases these changes in land use cause a patchy break-up of the wild landscape. Agricultural land frequently displays this type of extremely fragmented, or relictual habitat. Farms sprawl across the landscape with patches of uncleared woodland or forest dotted in-between occasional paddocks.

Examples of habitat destruction include grazing of bushland by farmed animals, changes to natural fire regimes, forest clearing for timber production and wetland draining for city expansion. This is particularly challenging since wild animals cannot drink tap water, which means they cannot autonomously survive in those habitats where there is no surface water access.

=== Impact of introduced species ===
Mice, cats, rabbits, dandelions and poison ivy are all examples of species that have become invasive threats to wild species in various parts of the world. Frequently species that are uncommon in their home range become out-of-control invasions in distant but similar climates. The reasons for this have not always been clear and Charles Darwin felt it was unlikely that exotic species would ever be able to grow abundantly in a place in which they had not evolved. The reality is that the vast majority of species exposed to a new habitat do not reproduce successfully. Occasionally, however, some populations do take hold and after a period of acclimation can increase in numbers significantly, having destructive effects on many elements of the native environment of which they have become part.

=== Chains of extinction ===
This final group is one of secondary effects. All wild populations of living things have many complex intertwining links with other living things around them. Large herbivorous animals such as the hippopotamus have populations of insectivorous birds that feed off the many parasitic insects that grow on the hippo. Should the hippo die out, so too will these groups of birds, leading to further destruction as other species dependent on the birds are affected. Also referred to as a domino effect, this series of chain reactions is by far the most destructive process that can occur in any ecological community.

Another example is the black drongos and the cattle egrets found in India. These birds feed on insects on the back of cattle, which helps to keep them disease-free. Destroying the nesting habitats of these birds would cause a decrease in the cattle population because of the spread of insect-borne diseases.

== See also ==
- Do not feed the animals
- Endangered species
- Ex situ conservation
- In situ conservation
- Wildlife conservation
- Wildlife corridor
- Wildness
- World Wildlife Day
- Urban wildlife
