= Yew-Kwang Ng =

Malaysian-Australian economist (born 1942)

Yew-Kwang Ng FASSA
- 黄有光
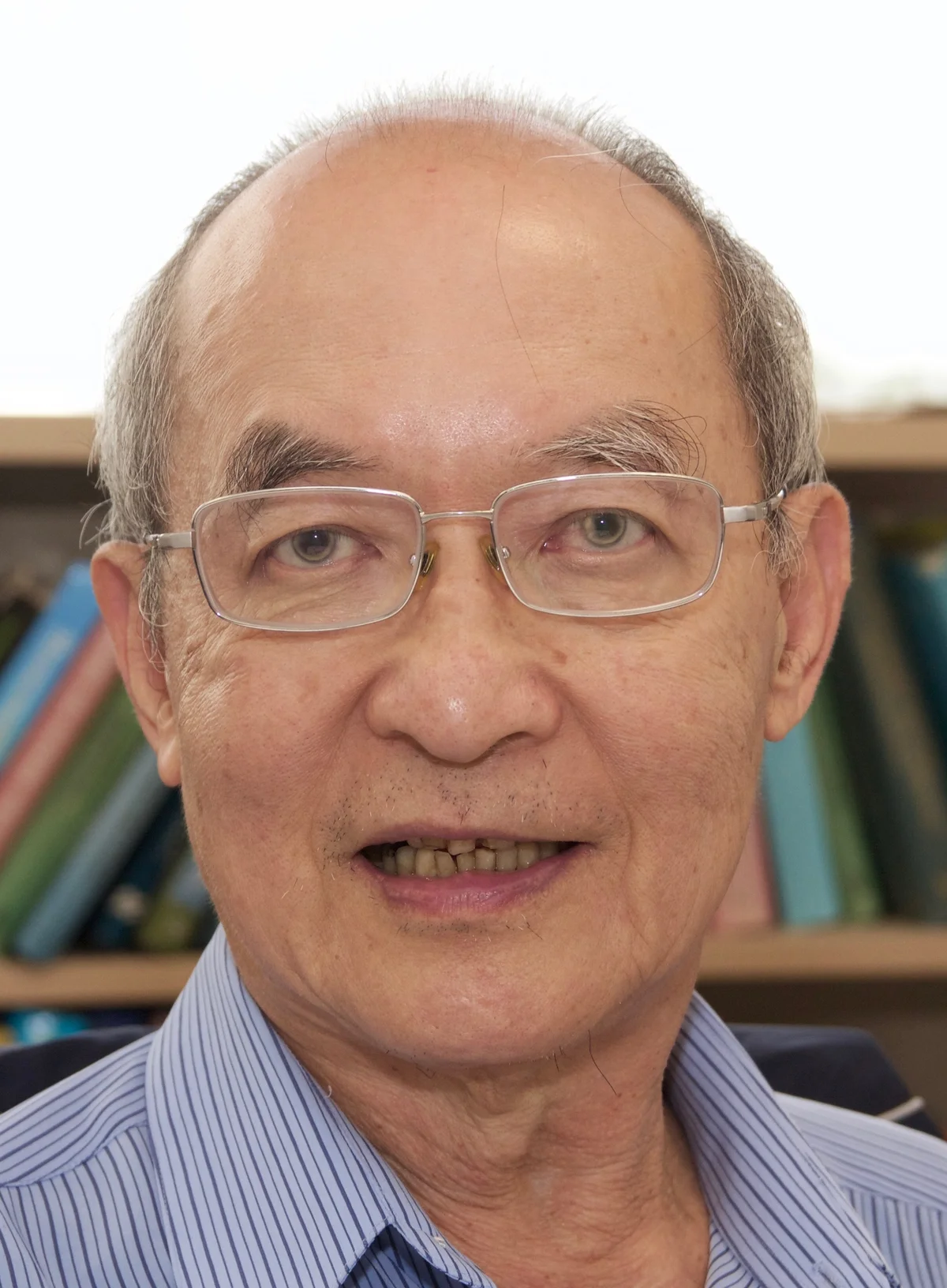
- Ng in 2026
- Born: 7 August 1942 (age 84); Japanese-occupied Malaya

Academic background
- Education: Nanyang University; University of Sydney

Academic work
- Discipline: Welfare economics
- Institutions: Monash University; Nanyang Technological University; Fudan University; Peking University
- Awards: Distinguished Fellow of the Economic Society of Australia (2007)

Chinese name
- Traditional Chinese: 黃有光
- Simplified Chinese: 黄有光
- Hanyu Pinyin: Huáng Yǒu Guāng
- Jyutping: Wong4 Jau5 Gwong1
- Hokkien POJ: N̂g Iú-kong
- Tâi-lô: N̂g Iú-kong
- Website: yewkwangng.com

Yew-Kwang Ng or Kwang (Chinese: 黃有光; English pronunciation /ˈkwæŋ/; born 7 August 1942) is a Malaysian-Australian economist. He is an emeritus professor of economics at Monash University and an honorary professor at the School of Economics, Peking University. He was elected a Fellow of the Academy of the Social Sciences in Australia in 1981, and a Distinguished Fellow of the Economic Society of Australia in 2007. He also received the Award for Outstanding Educational Contribution from Peking University in 2025.

Ng is known for his work in welfare economics (including social choice theory) and happiness economics. In particular, he proposed the theory of third best. This theory frees welfare economics from the stranglehold of the theory of second best. He has also written on utilitarianism, animal welfare, welfare biology, and effective altruism.

== Life and career ==
Ng was born during the Second World War in Japanese-occupied Malaya. He has said that, while in high school, he became interested in economics because of an ambition to "establish communism in an independent Malaysia". His views later changed, influenced by his study of economics and by events including the Cultural Revolution in China and developments in the Soviet Union.

Ng graduated with a Bachelor of Commerce from Nanyang University in 1966 and received a PhD from the University of Sydney in 1971. During his studies at Nanyang University, and earlier during his high school years, he came close to being arrested or expelled several times during periods of political unrest.

During the 1980s, while working as a columnist, Ng wrote in support of Deng Xiaoping's reform and opening up. He has been a Fellow of the Academy of the Social Sciences in Australia since 1981. He was professor of economics at Monash University from 1985 to 2012 and later became emeritus professor.

From 2013 to 2019, Ng held the Winsemius Chair at the Department of Economics at Nanyang Technological University. In 2018, he delivered the inaugural Atkinson Memorial Lecture at the University of Oxford, dedicated to the memory of Sir Tony Atkinson. From July 2019 to December 2020, he was Special Chair Professor at the School of Economics at Fudan University in Shanghai. He has also written a column for the Chinese business news portal NetEase Finance.

== Research ==
Ng has written or co-authored more than 30 books and published more than 200 refereed papers, mainly in economics, with additional work on biology, mathematics, philosophy, cosmology, psychology, and sociology. He proposed welfare biology as a field of research in 1995, and later described it as one of his more underestimated contributions. He published his first academic paper in the Journal of Political Economy (one of the top five journals in economics) while he was an undergraduate student.

=== Economics ===
Ng's main field is welfare economics. His first book on the subject, Welfare Economics: Introduction and Development of Basic Concepts, was published in 1979. This was later expanded into: Welfare Economics: Towards a More Complete Analysis, 2004, London: Palgrave/Macmillan.

Within welfare economics, he has written on the theory of the third best, social choice theory, and happiness economics. In several publications, he defends a view of utility as cardinally measurable and interpersonally comparable.

In several papers (Ng 1980, Ng 1982, Ng 1992) and a book (Ng 1986), Ng integrated microeconomics, macroeconomics and general equilibrium analysis into what he terms "mesoeconomics". Among others, this approach is used to study the implications of imperfect competition for the macroeconomy. Well-known economists W. Max Corden, Peter Forsyth, and Christis G. Tombazos wrote that mesoeconomics "typically yields conclusions that are consistently more closely aligned with empirical evidence than any of the competing macroeconomic models."

Ng presents Keynesian and monetarist results concerning the effects on the price level versus aggregate output of changes in nominal aggregate demand as special cases within the framework.

Ng also contributed to inframarginal economics, a field associated with the division of labour pioneered by Xiaokai Yang. Corden, Forsyth, and Tombazos describe it as providing an analytical framework "to reconcile the focus of neoclassical economics on distribution with the preoccupations of classical economists" concerning the division of labour. Ng collaborated with Xiaokai Yang on the subject, and in 1993 they published Specialization and Economic Organization: A New Classical Microeconomic Framework. Yang is also the first author.

In 2024, Ng and Shuying Wang published a paper in Pacific Economic Review on the effects of United States antidumping measures on imports from China, using a mesoeconomic model to analyse import volumes and prices. Wang is the first author.

=== Moral philosophy and animal welfare ===
Ng advocates hedonistic utilitarianism and has defended this position in academic papers, including work written with Peter Singer. He also argues for the view in his 2000 book Efficiency, Equality, and Public Policy.

Ng's work on animal welfare, global catastrophic risks, and the measurement of well-being has been discussed in relation to ideas later associated with effective altruism. In a 2020 paper, he analysed the implications of the theory of the second best for effective altruism, arguing that informational and administrative constraints place decision-making in a "third best" setting.

Ng proposed welfare biology in 1995 as a field concerned with the welfare of living organisms in relation to their environments. In 2016, he argued that welfare biology and common-sense reasoning could help reduce animal suffering. In 2024, he published an article in Open Access Government arguing that animal suffering, especially among farmed animals, could often be reduced at little cost to humans.

=== Happiness economics and market ethics ===
Ng's 2022 open-access book Happiness: Concept, Measurement and Promotion discusses the concept and measurement of happiness, the East-Asian happiness gap, the environmentally responsible happy nation index, and public policy implications including public spending and animal welfare.

In Markets and Morals: Justifying Kidney Sales and Legalizing Prostitution (2019), Ng argues from a welfare-economics and utilitarian perspective for expanding legal markets into areas including kidney sales and sex work.

In 2024, Ng published Do We Survive Our Biological Death?: A Rational Examination, a book on the possibility of survival after death.

== Awards and honours ==
In 2007, Ng was made a Distinguished Fellow of the Economic Society of Australia. In the associated tribute, Corden, Forsyth, and Tombazos described him as "one of Australia's most important and best internationally known economists". The tribute also quoted Nobel laureate Kenneth Arrow as describing Ng as "one of the leading economic theorists of his generation", and another Nobel laureate James Buchanan as saying that Ng had "made major contributions in theoretical Welfare Economics".

After his retirement from Monash University, Ng was listed among the Department of Economics' honorary and adjunct appointments. He was on the advisory board of the Global Priorities Institute at the University of Oxford from 2018 to 2023.

== Political and social views ==
Ng has described excessive inequality as "a very important issue", ranking it after environmental protection and peacekeeping among public issues. He has also argued for more generous immigration policies, writing that immigrants can bring factors complementary to local ones.

In 2020, Ng wrote a column suggesting that legalising polyandry could reduce problems arising from the male-skewed gender ratio in China. He also said he intended to write a follow-up column discussing the pros and cons of legalising prostitution. The column attracted criticism online. Critics described the argument as misogynistic and offensive, while others objected to polyandry as contrary to traditional marriage.

== Philanthropy ==
In 2015, Ng offered to match donations up to $25,000 to Animal Ethics, a non-profit organisation that promotes animal ethics and provides information and resources for animal advocates.

At the Nanyang Technological University Chinese Heritage Centre's Mid-Autumn Festival charity auction in 2016, Ng and his wife donated S$100,000 for the purchase of a painting by Yang Bailiang, which Ng donated to the centre for permanent display. In 2025, he contributed more than ten million Chinese yuan, about US$1.5 million, to the School of Economics, Peking University, to help establish a scholarship.

He also contributed £2 million to the Society for Psychical Research, establishing the Yew-Kwang Ng (黄有光) Fund for Survival Research.

== Selected bibliography ==
=== Articles ===
- —— (1982). "A Micro-Macroeconomic Analysis Based on a Representative Firm". Economica. New Series. 49 (194): 121–139.
- —— (1984). "Quasi-Pareto Social Improvements". American Economic Review. 74 (5): 1033–1050.
- —— (1990). "Welfarism and Utilitarianism: A Rehabilitation". Utilitas. 2 (2): 171–193.
- —— (1992). "Business Confidence and Depression Prevention: A Mesoeconomic Perspective". American Economic Review. 82 (2): 365–371.
- —— (1995). "Towards Welfare Biology: Evolutionary Economics of Animal Consciousness and Suffering". Biology and Philosophy. 10 (3): 255–285.
- —— (1997). "A Case for Happiness, Cardinalism, and Interpersonal Comparability". Economic Journal. 107 (445): 1848–1858.
- —— (1999). "Utility, informed preference, or happiness: Following Harsanyi's argument to its logical conclusion". Social Choice and Welfare. 16: 197–216.
- ——; Ng, Siang (2001). "Welfare-reducing Growth Despite Individual and Government Optimization". Social Choice and Welfare. 18 (3): 497–506.
- ——; Bierman, Harold (2001). "Is Public Spending Good for You?". World Economics. 2 (2): 1–17.
- —— (2003). "From Preference to Happiness: Towards a More Complete Welfare Economics". Social Choice and Welfare. 20 (2): 307–350.
- ——; Clarke, Matthew (2006). "Population Dynamics and Animal Welfare: Issues Raised by the Culling of Kangaroos in Puckapunyal". Social Choice and Welfare. 27 (2): 407–422.
- —— (2007). "Eternal Coase and External Costs: A Case for Bilateral Taxation and Amenity Rights". European Journal of Political Economy. 23 (3): 641–659.
- —— (2011). "Happiness Is Absolute, Universal, Ultimate, Unidimensional, Cardinally Measurable and Interpersonally Comparable: A Basis for the Environmentally Responsible Happy Nation Index". Monash Economics Working Papers. 16–11.
- —— (2011). "Consumption tradeoff vs. catastrophes avoidance: implications of some recent results in happiness studies on the economics of climate change". Climatic Change. 105: 109–127.
- —— (2016). "How welfare biology and common sense may help to reduce animal suffering". Animal Sentience. 1 (7).
- —— (2016). "The Importance of Global Extinction in Climate Change Policy". Global Policy. 7 (3): 315–322.
- —— (2017). "Towards a Theory of Third-Best". Pacific Economic Review. 22 (2): 155–166.
- —— (2020). "Effective altruism despite the second-best challenge: Should indirect effects Be taken into account for policies for a better future?". Futures. 121.

=== Books ===
- —— (1979). Welfare Economics. London: Macmillan.
- —— (1983). Welfare Economics. London: Macmillan.
- —— (1986). Mesoeconomics: A Micro-Macro Analysis. London: Wheatsheaf.
- —— (1990). Social Welfare and Economic Policy. London: Wheatsheaf.
- ——; Yang, Xiaokai (1993). Specialization and Economic Organization. Amsterdam: North-Holland.
- —— (1994). The Unparalleled Mystery. Beijing: Writers Press. ISBN 7-5063-0695-6.
- ——; Arrow, Kenneth; Yang, Xiaokai, eds. (1998). Increasing Returns and Economic Analysis. London: Macmillan.
- —— (1999). Economics and Happiness (Collected papers in Chinese). Taipei: Maw Chang.
- —— (2000). Efficiency, Equality, and Public Policy: With a Case for Higher Public Spending. London: Macmillan.
- —— (2011). Common Mistakes in Economics by the Public, Students, Economists & Nobel Laureates. New York: Nova Science Publishers.
- —— (2019). Markets and Morals: Justifying Kidney Sales and Legalizing Prostitution. Cambridge: Cambridge University Press.
- —— (2020). Evolved-God Creationism. Newcastle upon Tyne: Cambridge Scholars Publishing.
- —— (2022). Happiness: Concept, Measurement and Promotion. New York: Springer.
- —— (2024). Do We Survive Our Biological Death?: A Rational Examination. Chisinau: Eliva Press.
