= Compassionate conservation =

Discipline combining conservation and animal welfare

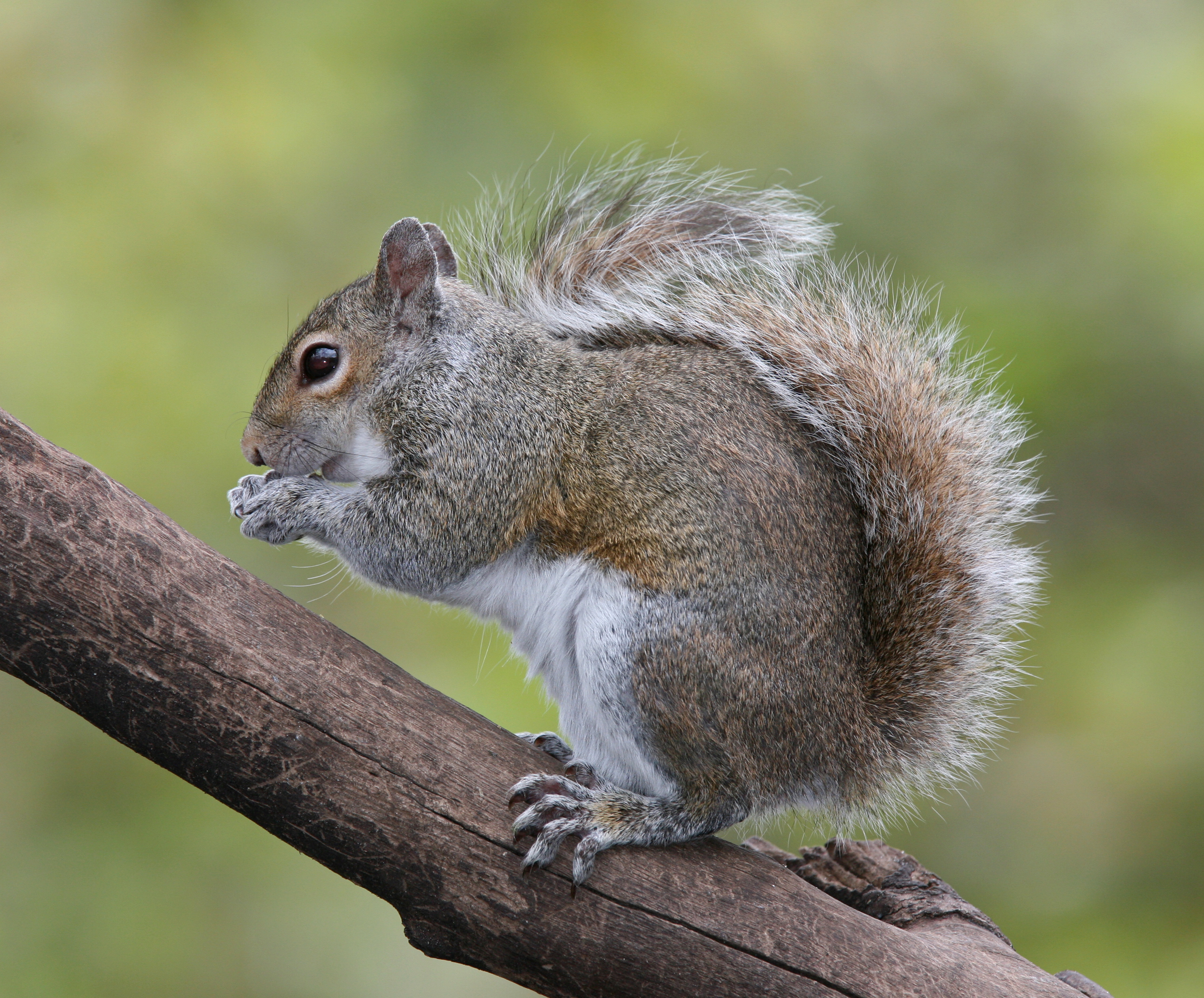
The eastern gray squirrel is considered an invasive species in some countries. Advocates of compassionate conservation oppose killing individual animals in conservation programmes.

Compassionate conservation is a discipline that combines conservation and animal welfare. The two fields have often been treated as separate and sometimes as being in conflict. Proposed principles of compassionate conservation include "first do no harm, individuals matter, inclusivity, and peaceful coexistence".

Supporters argue that conservation has usually measured success through the preservation of species, populations and ecosystems, rather than through explicit concern for the welfare and intrinsic value of individual animals. They argue that conservation action should be guided by compassion for all sentient beings and that killing animals for conservation purposes is unnecessary because the same objectives can be pursued through non-lethal methods.

Some conservationists have criticised compassionate conservation, arguing that it may conflict with conservation goals.

== History ==
The international wildlife charity Born Free Foundation, which advocates for the welfare of individual wild animals, used the phrase "compassionate conservation" for an Oxford-based symposium it hosted in 2010. The Centre for Compassionate Conservation was established in 2013 at the University of Technology Sydney. Ignoring Nature No More: The Case for Compassionate Conservation, a collection of essays edited by compassionate conservation advocate Marc Bekoff, was published in the same year.

Later conferences were held on the topic, and supporters published articles in conservation journals.

== Criticism ==
Some conservationists have described compassionate conservation as "seriously flawed". They argue that its implementation is impractical and could have negative effects on wildlife, ecosystems, humans, and native biodiversity. Other critics argue that a "do no harm" approach goes "too far" and would not necessarily improve the welfare of individual animals. Andrea S. Griffin et al. argue that compassionate conservation's focus on empathy "is subject to significant biases and that inflexible adherence to moral rules can result in a 'do nothing' approach".

Several management approaches supported by advocates of compassionate conservation as alternatives to lethal control have been studied experimentally or observationally. Trap-neuter-return management of feral cat populations has been proposed as an alternative to lethal methods such as shooting or baiting, but research has not found TNR to be an effective means of controlling feral cat populations.

Wildlife contraceptives have also been proposed as a non-lethal method for managing overpopulation in native wildlife species. Attempts to use this approach for overabundant koala populations on Kangaroo Island in South Australia were unsuccessful because of logistical and cost-effectiveness barriers. Other non-lethal approaches, including wildlife fertility control, were also unsuccessful. As with trap-neuter-return programmes, non-lethal reproductive management of part of a population may result in compensatory increases in reproductive success among untreated individuals. Translocation to lower-abundance habitats was also unsuccessful because many translocated individuals died, undermining the intended welfare benefit of the approach.

== See also ==
- Conservation welfare – Proposed discipline
- Opposition to hunting – Movement against hunting
- Relationship between animal ethics and environmental ethics
- Welfare biology – Proposed interdisciplinary field
- Wild animal suffering – Suffering of wild animals due to natural processes
- Wildlife management – Management and control of wildlife populations
