= Animal Charity Evaluators =

American nonprofit

- Abbreviation: ACE
- Formation: 2012; 14 years ago
- Type: Nonprofit
- Tax ID no.: EIN 364684978
- Legal status: 501(c)(3) organization
- Purpose: Animal charity evaluation
- Location: Covina, California, U.S.
- Region served: Global
- Executive Director: Stien van der Ploeg
- Website: animalcharityevaluators.org
- Formerly called: Effective Animal Activism

Animal Charity Evaluators (ACE), formerly known as Effective Animal Activism, is an American charity evaluator and effective altruism-focused nonprofit founded in 2012. ACE evaluates animal charities and compares the effectiveness of their different campaigns and strategies. The organization makes charity recommendations to donors once a year. Its stated purpose is finding and promoting the most effective ways to help animals.

== History ==
Animal Charity Evaluators was formed in 2012 as Effective Animal Activism, a division of 80,000 Hours, by the Centre for Effective Altruism. It rebranded as Animal Charity Evaluators (ACE) in 2013. Australian philosopher Peter Singer sits on the organization's advisory board.

From its inception, ACE annually published recommendations for charities to donate to based on their impact and effectiveness, under two categories: "top" and "standout". However, when it published its 2023 recommendations, it moved away from these categories, instead moving to only "recommended" charities. This was intended to more fairly represent the charities present and better support the animal advocacy movement.

== Recommendations ==
ACE publishes its recommended charities once a year in November, ahead of GivingTuesday. In 2025, they recommended ten charities: Animal Welfare Observatory, Aquatic Life Institute, Çiftlik Hayvanlarını Koruma Derneği, Dansk Vegetarisk Forening, Good Food Fund, Shrimp Welfare Project, Sinergia Animal, Sociedade Vegetariana Brasileira, The Humane League, and Wild Animal Initiative.

== Reception ==
Marc Gunther reviewed ACE in a 2015 article for Nonprofit Chronicles, stating:

[T]he work of Animal Charity Evaluators (ACE) is relevant to nonprofits of all kinds. As its name suggests and, on a very modest budget, ACE evaluates animal charities. Its work could inspire those who want to evaluate charities in other sectors—education, the environment, that arts, whatever ... The point is, Animal Charity Evaluators is asking the right questions–the kind all nonprofits should be asking themselves.

Peter Singer mentions ACE's work in his 2015 book The Most Good You Can Do and in an online article for Salon. He describes their recommendations as a form of "altruistic arbitrage", picking the low-hanging fruits of animal activism, which he describes as worth supporting.

In 2017, Harrison Nathan and the animal rights group SHARK criticised ACE, suggesting they were biased in favour of charities associated with one charity founder, Nick Cooney. Nathan and ACE engaged in an exchange of open letters and responses.

ACE's evaluations have been used as the basis for FarmKind's charity recommendations.

== See also ==
- List of animal rights groups
- List of animal welfare organizations
