= Eurogroup for Animals =

Animal protection lobby group

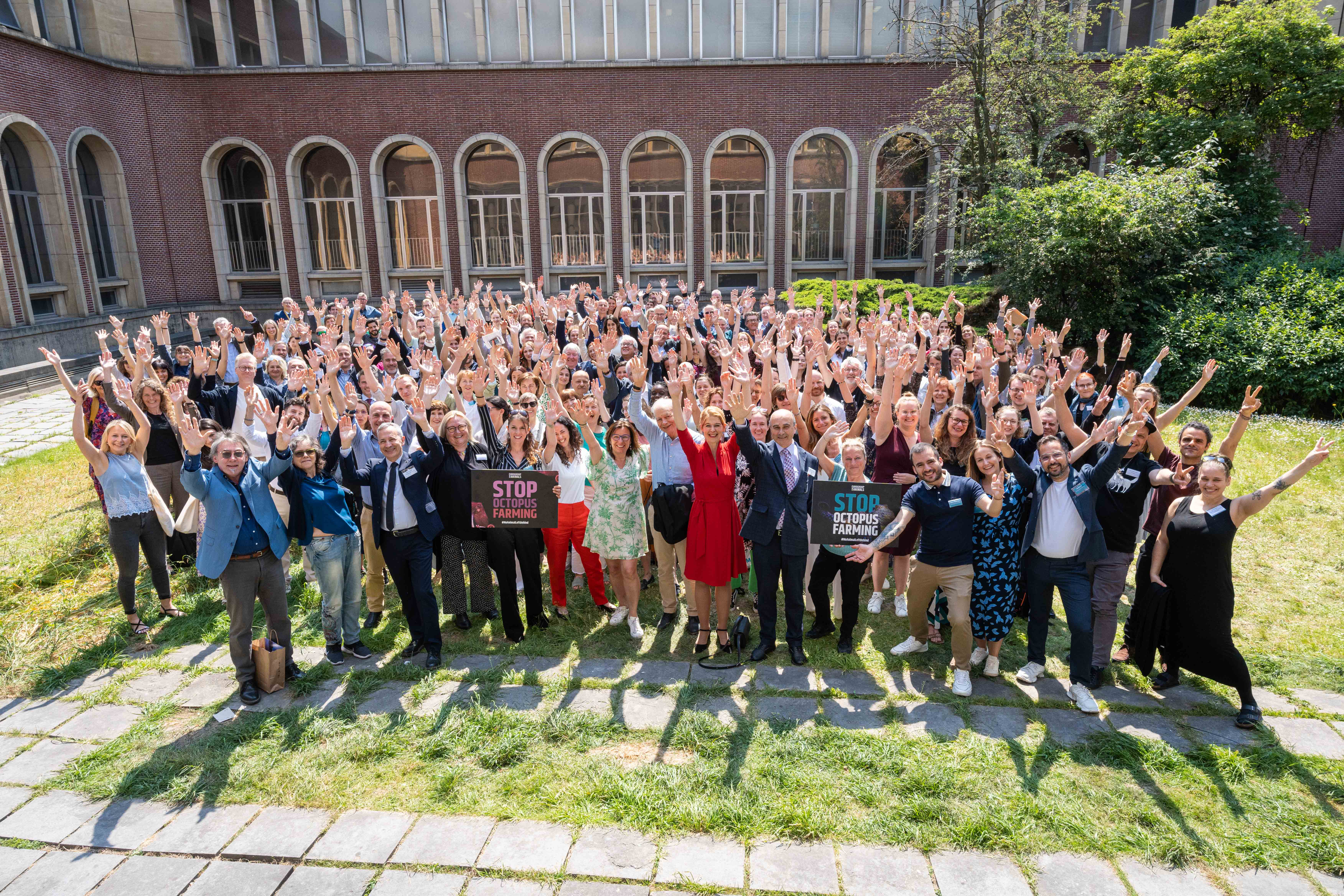
- Eurogroup for Animals Annual Conference, 2023
- Formation: 1980; 46 years ago
- Founders: RSPCA, Dierenbescherming, Deutscher Tierschutzbund, Dyrenes Beskyttelse, La Société Protectrice des Animaux (SPA) and Lëtzebuerger Déiereschutzliga
- Type: NGO
- Headquarters: Rue Ducale, Brussels, Belgium
- Region served: European Union
- Services: Public affairs (lobbying)
- Website: eurogroupforanimals.org

Eurogroup for Animals is an animal protection lobby group based in Brussels, Belgium, that seeks to improve animal welfare standards in the European Union. The association represents animal protection organisations across the 27 EU Member States and several other countries.

Eurogroup for Animals provides advice and expertise on animal welfare to various European institutions, such as the European Commission, the Council of the European Union, and the European Parliament.

It also acts as the secretariat of the European Parliamentary Intergroup on the Welfare and Conservation of Animals, which meets at the European Parliament in Strasbourg for regular sessions.

The association works to improve the welfare of animals that are farmed or caught wild for the purposes of human consumption, animals used in science, companion animals and wild animals.

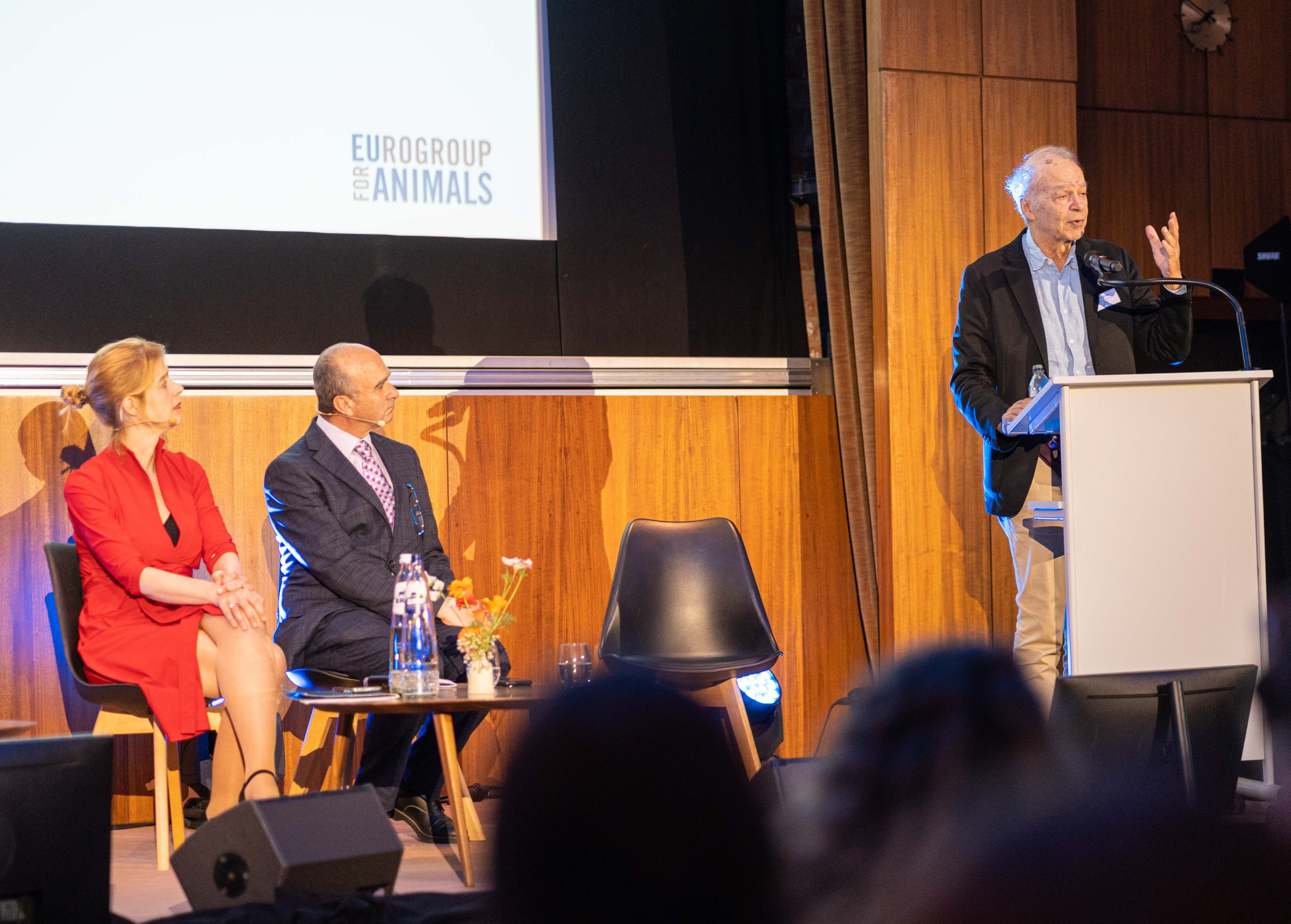
Philosopher Peter Singer, alongside Eurogroup for Animals President Philip Lymbery and CEO Reineke Hameleers, presenting at the Eurogroup for Animals Annual Conference in 2023

The association is headed by President Philip Lymbery (Global CEO of Compassion in World Farming, and CEO Reineke Hameleers.

== History ==
The RSPCA founded Eurogroup for Animals in 1980 (Britain was at the time in the European Community) along with five other organisations in other EEC (later EU) Member States (Dierenbescherming in the Netherlands, Deutscher Tierschutzbund in Germany, Dyrenes Beskyttelse in Denmark, La Société Protectrice des Animaux (SPA) in France and Lëtzebuerger Déiereschutzliga in Luxembourg).

It is one of the longest established lobby groups in Brussels, and has grown over the years to represent animal protection organisations in the 27 Member States of the European Union, as well as in several third countries, including the United Kingdom, Switzerland, Norway, and Australia.

In May 2022, Shrimp Welfare Project and the Bulgarian organisation Intimate With Nature Society joined Eurogroup for Animals.

Several global organisations such as Animals International, Compassion in World Farming and World Animal Protection are also members of Eurogroup for Animals.
