= Conservation welfare =

Proposed discipline

Conservation welfare is a proposed discipline concerned with common ground between conservation and animal welfare. Its supporters describe it as a way for the two fields to work together while pursuing their respective objectives.

The discipline has been described as drawing on Peter Singer's utilitarianism. Like compassionate conservation, it differs from some approaches in environmental ethics by concentrating on the welfare of individual animals rather than species, ecosystems or populations. Ngaio Beausoleil has argued that conservation welfare differs from compassionate conservation because the two approaches have different understandings of the harms experienced by wild animals. Beausoleil states that conservation welfare seeks to work with conservation scientists and incorporate animal welfare into existing conservation practice, while compassionate conservation may lack the capacity to "guide decision-making in complex or novel situations".

== See also ==
- Relationship between animal ethics and environmental ethics
- Welfare biology
