= Eyestalk ablation =

Removal of one or both eyestalks from a crustacean

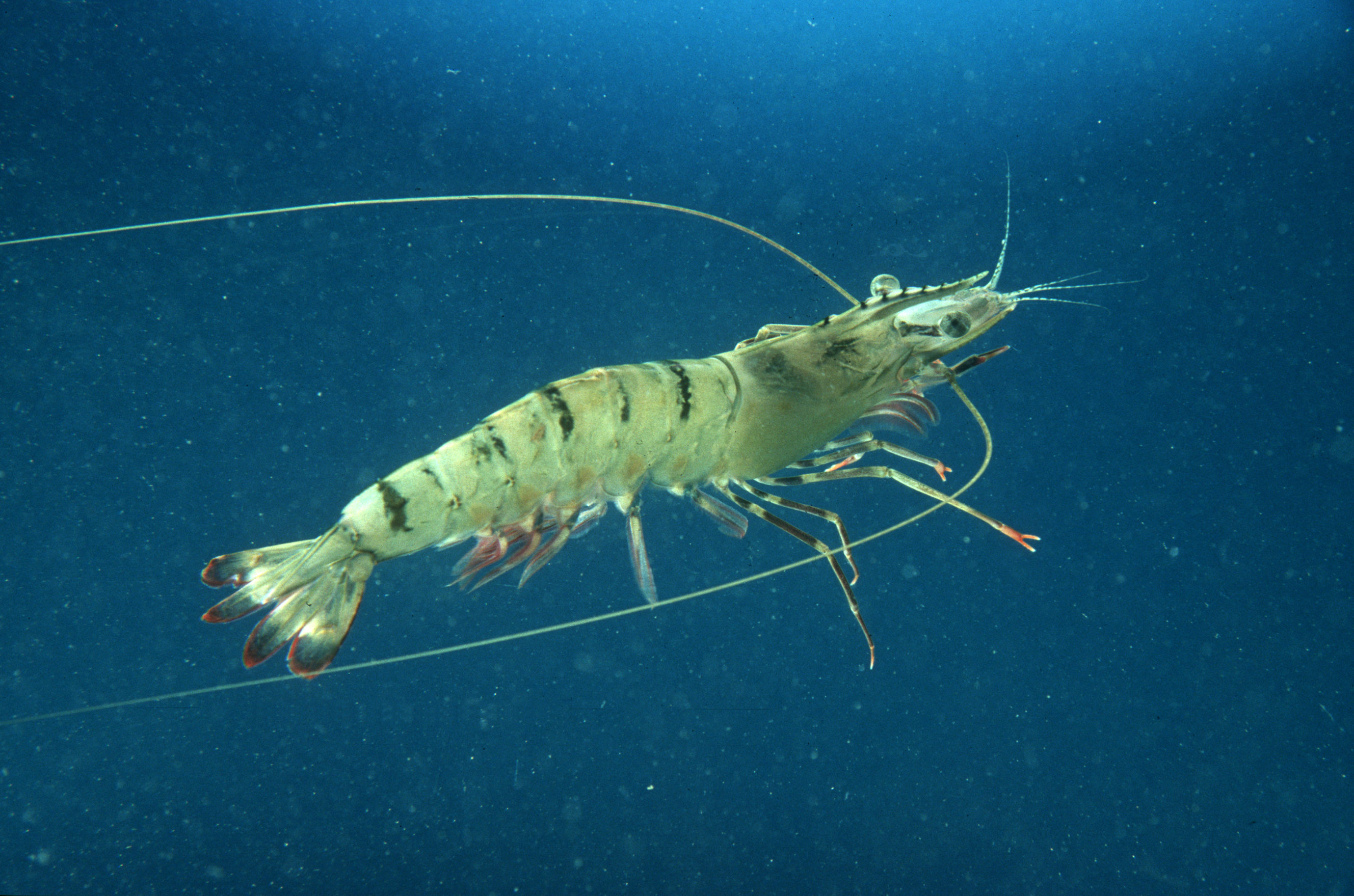
The eyestalks of female shrimp are often removed (ablated) to improve reproduction.

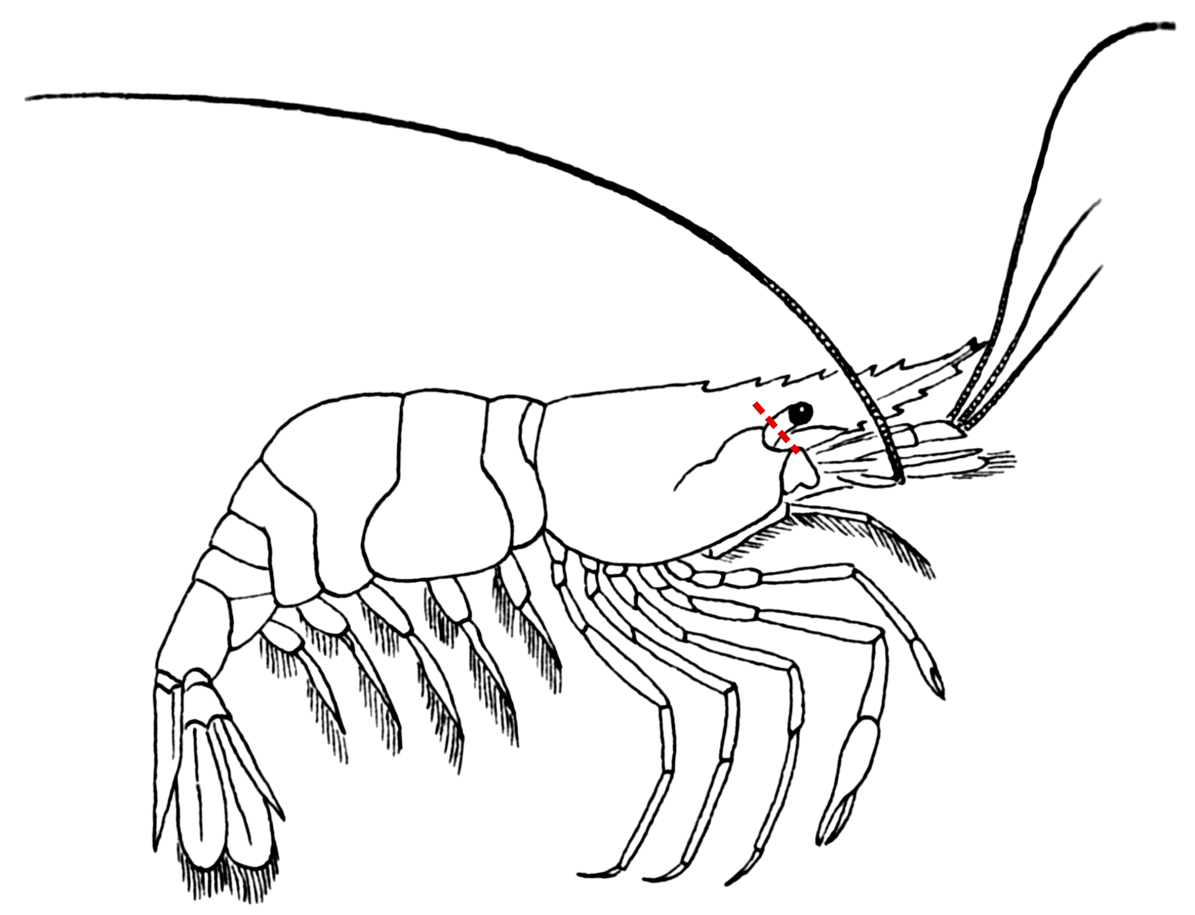
The red dotted line indicates the location on a shrimp where the eye stalk is cut or cauterised during ablation.

Eyestalk ablation is the removal of one (unilateral) or both (bilateral) eyestalks from a crustacean. It is routinely practiced on female shrimps (or female prawns) in almost every marine shrimp maturation or reproduction facility in the world, both research and commercial. The aim of ablation under these circumstances is to stimulate the female shrimp to develop mature ovaries and spawn. The practice has drawn criticism from animal welfare advocates due to concerns about pain, distress, and long-term impacts on shrimp health and behaviour.

Most captive conditions for shrimp cause inhibitions in females that prevent them from developing mature ovaries. Even in conditions where a given species will develop ovaries and spawn in captivity, use of eyestalk ablation increases total egg production and increases the percentage of females in a given population that will participate in reproduction. Once females have been subjected to eyestalk ablation, complete ovarian development often ensues within as little as 3 to 10 days. The practice was a major development for the commercialisation of shrimp farming in the 1970s and 80s since it enabled reliable production.

The most commonly accepted theory of why eye ablation reduces this inhibition is that a gonad inhibitory hormone (GIH) is produced in the neurosecretory complexes in the eyestalk. This hormone occurs in nature in the non-breeding season and is absent or present only in low concentrations during the breeding season. The reluctance of most shrimp to routinely develop mature ovaries in captivity is a function of elevated levels of GIH, and eyestalk ablation lowers the high haemolymph titer of GIH. The effect of eyestalk ablation is not on a single hormone such as GIH, but rather affects several physiological processes. Besides the GIH evidence, another hypothesis suggests that eyestalk ablation also reduces light perception intensity and thereby induces ovarian maturation. In the banana prawn (Fenneropenaeus merguiensis, syn. Penaeus merguiensis), dim light favours ovarian maturation and spawning. The exact mechanism of eyestalk ablation on the ovarian maturation is not conclusive.

It has been reported that in the tiger prawn (Penaeus monodon), the eyestalks fully regenerate in less than six months.

== Effects ==
There are several direct and indirect effects of eye ablation in female shrimps, including:

- increase of total egg production by producing more frequent spawnings, but not larger spawns
- shorter moult cycle duration
- increased mortality rate by up to three times
- deterioration of female condition
- in some instances, a lower hatch rate of eggs
- changes in ovarian colour
- increased energetic demands
- eventual loss of egg quality
- production of offspring that are more vulnerable to diseases such as WSSV

== Techniques ==
Techniques for eyestalk ablation include:

1. Pinching the eyestalk, usually half to two-thirds down the eyestalk. This method may leave an open wound.
2. Slitting one eye with a razor blade, then crushing the eyestalk, with thumb and index fingernail, beginning one-half to two-thirds down the eyestalk and moving distally until the contents of eyes have been removed. This method, sometimes called enucleation, leaves behind the transparent exoskeleton so that clotting of haemolymph, and closure of the wound, may occur more rapidly.
3. Cauterizing through the eyestalk with either an electrocautery device or an instrument such as a red-hot wire or forceps. If performed correctly, this method closes the wound and allows scar tissue to form more readily. A variation of this technique is to use scissors or a sharp blade to sever the eyestalk, and then to cauterize the wound.
4. Ligation by tying off the eyestalk tightly with surgical or other thread. This method also has the advantage of immediate wound closure.

== Ethical concerns ==
Animal welfare advocates and researchers have raised significant concerns about the suffering caused by eyestalk ablation procedures. The procedure is typically performed without anaesthesia, and critics argue that the resulting impaired vision increases stress and vulnerability in the animals.

Organizations including Mercy For Animals, Compassion in World Farming, and the Shrimp Welfare Project have launched campaigns against the practice. These efforts have resulted in commitments from major retailers including Tesco and Co-op to eliminate eyestalk ablation from their supply chains by 2027.

Eyestalk ablation is currently prohibited in Europe for organic production.

In 2016, Seajoy, one of the major producers of premium farmed shrimp in Central America, started to farm only ablation-free shrimp.

== Alternatives ==
Viable alternatives to the cutting include:

- giving high quality, nutritious feed to broodstock in pre-maturation stage
- changing the sex ratio in breeding tanks from 1:1 to 1:2 (male-to-female)

Non-ablated females have lower mortality rates and produce more robust offspring thereby reducing the need for chemicals and antibiotics.

Macrobrachium americanum prawns treated with lignocaine (a local anaesthetic in mammals) prior to eyestalk ablation show less rubbing, flicking and sheltering than those not given the anaesthetic.

== See also ==
- Pain in crustaceans
