= Wild Animal Initiative =

Wild animal welfare nonprofit organization

- Abbreviation: WAI
- Formation: 2019; 7 years ago
- Founders: Abraham Rowe; Persis Eskander
- Founded at: Farmington, Minnesota
- Merger of: Utility Farm; Wild-Animal Suffering Research
- Type: 501(c)(3)
- Tax ID no.: EIN 82-2281466
- Legal status: Nonprofit
- Location: Minneapolis, Minnesota, United States
- Region served: Global
- Fields: Wild animal welfare
- Executive Director: Cameron Meyer Shorb
- Revenue: $2,487,849 (2024)
- Website: wildanimalinitiative.org

Wild Animal Initiative (WAI) is an American nonprofit organization that conducts and funds research on wild animal welfare. Its work focuses on developing scientific methods for assessing the welfare of free-living animals and supporting researchers studying their experiences and the factors affecting their well-being. Formed in 2019 through the merger of Utility Farm and Wild-Animal Suffering Research, WAI has been recommended by Animal Charity Evaluators (ACE) since 2020.

== History ==
WAI was formed in 2019 through the merger of Utility Farm, founded in 2016 by Abraham Rowe, and Wild-Animal Suffering Research, founded in 2017 by Persis Eskander. Utility Farm acquired the funds of Wild-Animal Suffering Research and legally changed its name to Wild Animal Initiative. The organization subsequently concentrated its work on supporting academic research into wild animal welfare.

Abraham Rowe was WAI's founding Executive Director. He was succeeded in July 2019 by Mal Graham, who had previously worked as a researcher at the organization. In 2022, Graham became Strategy Director and Cameron Meyer Shorb became Executive Director.

In 2021, WAI received a $3.5 million grant from Coefficient Giving, then known as Open Philanthropy, to support research on wild animal welfare. In July of that year, it announced the establishment of a research fund intended to distribute more than $3 million to academic projects over the following two years. Its first call for proposals focused on the welfare and ecology of juvenile wild animals.

In 2023, WAI received a further $6 million grant from Open Philanthropy to support its research grants program and general operations. At the time, the organization reported having distributed more than $1.3 million across 42 research projects since 2021.

== Activities ==
WAI works to develop wild animal welfare science as an academic field. Its activities include conducting research, providing grants to external researchers, and organizing scientific events and networking opportunities. The organization identifies three broad research areas: foundational research into wild animals' experiences, the development of methods for measuring their welfare, and studies of the effects of potential interventions, including those undertaken for wildlife management and conservation.

=== Research and grants ===
WAI's research program includes studies intended to develop and validate indicators of animal welfare. Its grants program supports researchers examining the welfare of different animal groups, including fish, birds, mammals, and invertebrates. The organization also funds studies of potential interventions and their effects on individual animals.

In its 2025 evaluation, Animal Charity Evaluators reported that WAI had awarded $4.7 million in research funding to 72 projects since 2023. The funded work included studies of welfare indicators, fish and invertebrate welfare, parasites, pathogens, and potential interventions. ACE also reported that WAI had contributed to 16 peer-reviewed publications since 2023.

In June 2026, WAI announced grants totaling $727,658 for 13 additional research projects. The funded studies included investigations of welfare indicators in frogs, fish, urban birds, and aquatic mollusks, as well as research on the effects of environmental conditions and social disruption on wild animals.

=== Academic outreach ===
WAI organizes scientific events and provides resources intended to encourage researchers from different disciplines to study wild animal welfare. Its outreach activities include workshops, conference presentations, and a research community through which scientists can exchange information and establish collaborations.

ACE reported that WAI had recruited 170 new members to its research community in 2024 and contributed to the inclusion of wild animal welfare science in a university course. Its 2025 evaluation also noted WAI's involvement in establishing a seminar series with the Royal Veterinary College and the Zoological Society of London.

== Evaluations ==
In November 2020, Animal Charity Evaluators designated WAI as a "Top Charity", its highest recommendation category at the time. ACE cited WAI's research and its strategy of developing an academic field concerned with wild animal welfare. WAI retained its "Top Charity" status in 2021 and 2022.

In 2023, ACE replaced its "Top Charity" and "Standout Charity" categories with a single "Recommended Charity" designation. WAI remained among its recommended organizations. Its recommendation was renewed following a further evaluation in 2025. ACE continued to list WAI among its recommended charities in 2026.

In its 2025 review, ACE assessed WAI's approach of funding research and developing an academic field as a plausible means of improving wild animal welfare over the long term. However, it described the uncertainty surrounding the organization's eventual impact as moderate-to-high. ACE noted that the effects of research and academic outreach on animal welfare depend partly on the adoption of findings by other researchers, policymakers, and wildlife managers. It also found limited evidence that welfare assessment methods developed through WAI's research were being widely used.

ACE concluded that WAI had conducted its activities cost-effectively in terms of research and outreach outputs. However, it could not reliably estimate the amount of animal suffering prevented per dollar spent because of the indirect nature of the organization's work and the limited empirical evidence available on its long-term effects.

Charity Navigator has awarded WAI a four-star rating, with a score of 96% as of October 2026.

== See also ==
- Animal Ethics (organization) – American animal advocacy nonprofit organization
