= Shrimp Welfare Project =

British farmed shrimp welfare charity

- Abbreviation: SWP
- Founded: 2021; 5 years ago
- Founders: Andrés Jiménez Zorrilla; Aaron Boddy
- Type: Charity
- Registration no.: 1204414
- Headquarters: London, England
- Region served: England; India; Vietnam
- Methods: Corporate outreach; producer outreach; research
- Fields: Farmed shrimp welfare
- CEO: Krzysztof Wojtas
- Affiliations: Eurogroup for Animals
- Revenue: £2,242,275 (2025)
- Expenses: £592,743 (2025)
- Website: shrimpwelfareproject.org

Shrimp Welfare Project (SWP) is a British charity concerned with farmed shrimp welfare. Founded in 2021 by Andrés Jiménez Zorrilla and Aaron Boddy through a charity incubation programme associated with effective altruism, it works with shrimp producers and retailers to improve farming and slaughter practices. Its activities include promoting electrical stunning before slaughter, reducing stocking densities, improving water quality and ending eyestalk ablation. The organisation also conducts and supports research on shrimp welfare.

SWP joined Eurogroup for Animals in 2022. Animal Charity Evaluators first named it a Recommended Charity in 2023 and renewed its recommendation in 2025.

== History ==
Shrimp Welfare Project originated in the 2020 cohort of the Charity Entrepreneurship Incubation Program. The programme brought together Andrés Jiménez Zorrilla, who had left a career in private equity, and Aaron Boddy. They selected shrimp welfare as their area of work after examining the number of shrimp farmed for food, evidence concerning shrimp sentience and the limited attention given to shrimp by animal advocacy organisations at the time. SWP began operating in 2021.

In May 2022, SWP joined Eurogroup for Animals. The organisation described SWP as based in the United Kingdom and Spain and as the first organisation dedicated exclusively to shrimp welfare.

Shrimp Welfare Project Ltd was incorporated on 30 March 2022. It was registered as a charity in England and Wales on 21 August 2023.

== Activities ==
=== Slaughter methods ===
SWP's largest programme is its Humane Slaughter Initiative, which promotes electrical stunning of shrimp before slaughter. The organisation works with producers to replace methods such as asphyxiation and immersion in ice slurry, which may cause prolonged suffering. Under the initiative, producers that meet specified farming requirements and commit to stunning at least 120 million shrimp annually can receive electrical stunning equipment at minimal or no cost.

In February 2025, The Observer reported that SWP was supplying electrical stunners to shrimp producers and working with the seafood industry on farming and slaughter practices.

In its 2025 assessment, Animal Charity Evaluators (ACE) reported that SWP had deployed eight electrical stunners and signed agreements to provide 17 in total. ACE estimated that the agreements, once implemented, would cover approximately 3.3 billion farmed shrimp annually. The assessment also noted uncertainties about whether the equipment would be used correctly under different farming conditions and whether electrical stunning would consistently produce the intended effect.

SWP also approaches retailers, primarily in the United Kingdom and elsewhere in Europe, seeking commitments to source shrimp from suppliers using electrical stunning and other welfare measures. ACE reported that SWP had engaged with seven of the 11 main UK shrimp retailers and obtained six public commitments during 2024 and 2025. Three of these commitments were made in each year.

By the first half of 2026, SWP had signed 33 memoranda of understanding with shrimp producers and seafood suppliers. According to an August 2026 report by ACE, the organisation estimated that these agreements would cover approximately 6.1 billion shrimp annually once all the associated stunning equipment had been delivered and was operational.

=== Eyestalk ablation ===
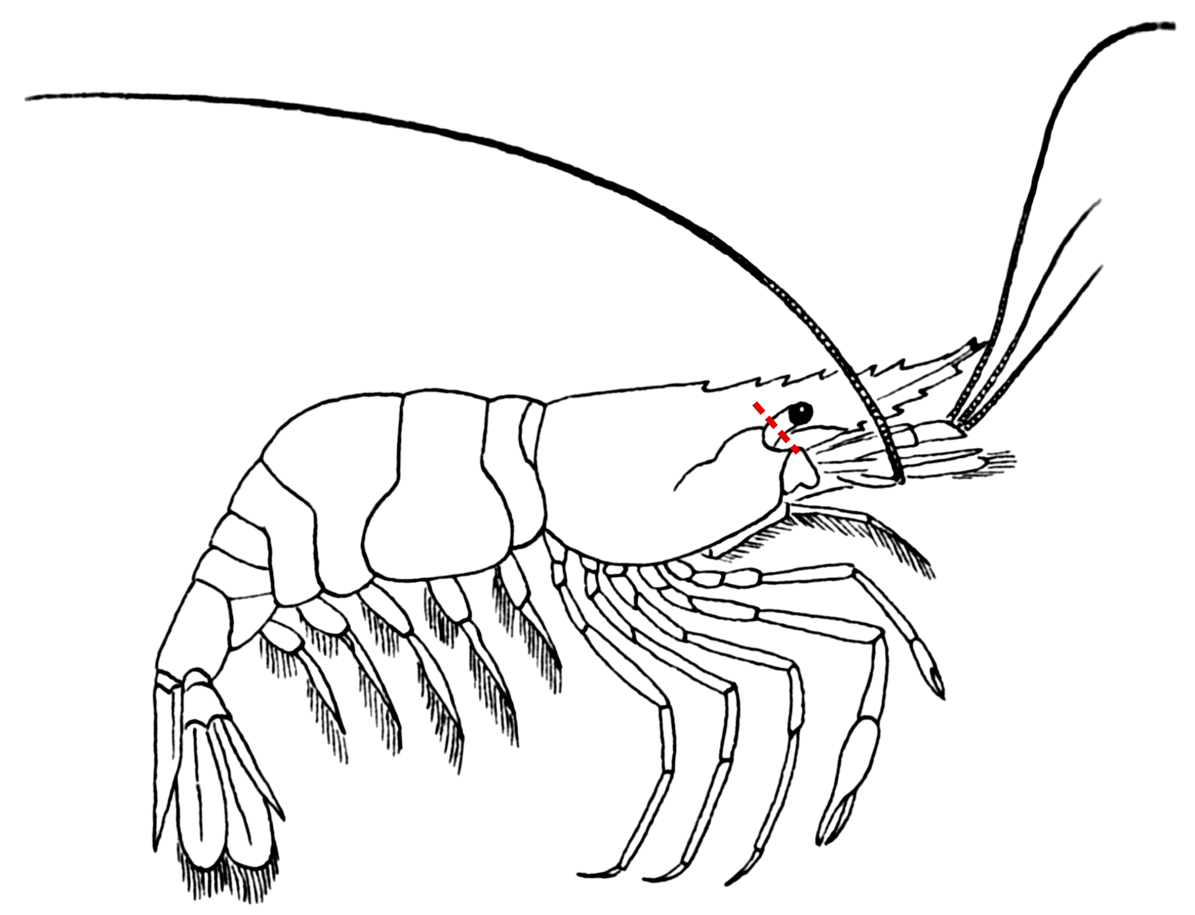
Diagram showing the location where the eyestalk is cut or cauterised during eyestalk ablation, a practice opposed by the Shrimp Welfare Project.

SWP opposes eyestalk ablation, a procedure in which part or all of a female shrimp's eyestalk is crushed or removed to stimulate reproduction. The practice is commonly used in shrimp breeding. As part of its agreements with producers, SWP can require them to obtain breeding shrimp from hatcheries that do not use eyestalk ablation.

=== Farming conditions and research ===
Through its Sustainable Shrimp Farmers of India programme, SWP works with small-scale shrimp farmers to improve conditions during the animals' lives. The programme involves removing accumulated sludge from farming ponds to address water-quality problems. Participating farmers must also agree to reduce stocking densities.

ACE reported that the first full year of the programme's pilot was completed in 2024, with sludge removed from 100 acres of ponds. SWP's measurements indicated improvements in some water-quality indicators, although ACE noted that the evidence for the welfare benefits of sludge removal remained limited. It was also uncertain how much of the observed improvement resulted from removing sludge rather than reducing stocking density.

SWP conducts and supports research on shrimp welfare, including the effects of farming conditions and slaughter methods. It has developed the Shrimp Welfare Index, a framework for assessing welfare practices in the farming of whiteleg shrimp (Litopenaeus vannamei). The organisation has also collaborated with researchers on methods of electrical stunning and the assessment of their effectiveness.

== Evaluation ==
Animal Charity Evaluators (ACE) first named SWP a Recommended Charity in November 2023. Its 2023 evaluation examined SWP's corporate outreach, producer outreach, research and movement-building activities. ACE identified uncertainty about the effectiveness of some forms of corporate and producer outreach, particularly the extent to which commitments would result in changes to farming practices.

ACE renewed its recommendation in 2025. Its assessment concluded that SWP's programmes were likely to improve shrimp welfare and that its spending had been cost-effective. However, it described the uncertainty surrounding its assessment of the programmes' effectiveness as moderate.

The evaluation identified several sources of uncertainty, including the correct implementation of electrical stunning in different farming environments, the possibility of obtaining further commitments from producers and retailers, the evidence for shrimp sentience, and the welfare effects of sludge removal. ACE also cautioned that its estimates of cost-effectiveness were highly uncertain because of difficulties in measuring the suffering prevented by the interventions.

== Public response ==
SWP's association with effective altruism and its focus on shrimp welfare have attracted criticism. In a September 2025 article for Vox, journalist Dylan Matthews examined the controversy surrounding the organisation and the wider debate over using numerical estimates to determine moral and charitable priorities. Some critics cited by Matthews regarded the attention given to shrimp welfare as an example of the problems with such approaches.

Matthews also interviewed co-founder Jiménez Zorrilla, who rejected the idea that supporting shrimp welfare required treating shrimp as more important than humans. Jiménez Zorrilla argued that the relevant question was whether improving the treatment of shrimp was worthwhile enough for some people to devote resources to it. He described SWP's work as seeking improvements within the existing shrimp industry rather than attempting to end shrimp farming.

== Finances ==
According to the Charity Commission for England and Wales, SWP reported income of £2,242,275 and expenditure of £592,743 for the financial year ending 31 March 2025. Approximately £2.18 million of its income came from donations and legacies, with a further £62,650 from investments.

== See also ==
- Animal welfare and rights in India
- Animal welfare in the United Kingdom
- Animal welfare science
- Ethics of uncertain sentience
- Marine shrimp farming
- Pain in crustaceans
