= Animal Ethics (organization) =

American animal advocacy nonprofit organization

- Abbreviation: AE
- Formation: 2012; 14 years ago
- Founders: Daniel Dorado; Oscar Horta; Leah McKelvie
- Type: Nonprofit
- Tax ID no.: EIN 461062870
- Legal status: 501(c)(3) organization
- Location: Oakland, California, U.S.
- Region served: Global
- Methods: Animal advocacy, research, and education
- Official languages: Arabic; Chinese (Simplified); English; French; German; Hindi; Italian; Japanese; Polish; Portuguese; Romanian; Spanish; Telugu
- Executive coordination: Sara Lago; Olaia Freiría
- Revenue: $170,491 (2025)
- Website: animal-ethics.org

Animal Ethics (AE) is an American nonprofit animal advocacy organization based in Oakland, California. Founded in 2012 by Daniel Dorado, Oscar Horta, and Leah McKelvie, it conducts research, education, and outreach on speciesism, animal sentience, animal exploitation, and wild animal suffering. The organization advocates extending moral consideration to all sentient beings, including animals living outside direct human control. Its activities include publishing educational materials in multiple languages, providing courses, and producing documentaries.

Animal Charity Evaluators (ACE) designated Animal Ethics a "Standout Charity" from December 2015 to November 2017.

== History ==
Animal Ethics was founded in 2012 by Daniel Dorado, Oscar Horta, and Leah McKelvie. Horta later stated that one reason for establishing the organization was to promote welfare biology as a field of research concerned with the welfare of animals living in the wild.

The organization is registered as a 501(c)(3) organization in the United States and has been tax-exempt since May 2019.

== Work ==
Animal Ethics conducts research and educational outreach intended to increase moral consideration for nonhuman animals. Its publications address speciesism, sentience, veganism, animal exploitation, and the circumstances of animals living in the wild. Rather than concentrating exclusively on particular forms of animal exploitation, the organization seeks to change attitudes towards nonhuman animals and opposition to species-based discrimination.

Its work on wild animal welfare includes research and educational material concerning suffering caused by natural processes and possible interventions to assist wild animals. Animal Ethics argues that the interests of sentient animals warrant consideration regardless of whether their suffering results from human activities. It has discussed vaccination programs and assistance to animals affected by natural disasters as examples of interventions that can improve wild animal welfare.

Animal Ethics also advocates further research into the welfare of wild animals, including methods for assessing their experiences and the effects of environmental conditions. In 2018, it published proposals for research projects in welfare biology, addressing subjects such as welfare assessment, population dynamics, and possible interventions.

The organization carries out outreach internationally, including through collaborations with animal advocacy groups and the translation of educational material. Its stated aim is for all sentient beings to receive moral consideration.

=== Projects and outreach ===
Animal Ethics awarded essay prizes for work on suffering among animals living in the wild in 2015 and 2017.

The organization began publishing resources in Chinese in 2018. In 2020, it extended its outreach to India, introduced a Hindi version of its website, and began releasing an online video course on wild animal suffering.

In 2024, Animal Ethics introduced an Arabic version of its website. In 2025, it added Japanese and released a Hindi-language version of its video course on wild animal suffering. The organization also reported conducting eight courses at Brazilian universities that year.

In October 2025, Animal Ethics released Seantience, a short documentary directed by Xiana Castro examining scientific evidence concerning sentience in aquatic animals, particularly invertebrates. The documentary includes interviews with researchers and philosophers, including Jonathan Birch and Oscar Horta. It formed part of a campaign that also included reports on aquatic animal sentience and educational outreach.

In March 2026, the organization released AI & Animals, a documentary examining the potential effects of artificial intelligence on nonhuman animals. It discusses the use of AI in animal agriculture, possible applications for improving wild animal welfare, and the implications of AI systems reproducing speciesist attitudes. The documentary includes interviews with researchers and animal advocates, including Peter Singer, Jeff Sebo, and Jonathan Birch.

== Reception ==
Animal Charity Evaluators designated Animal Ethics a "Standout Charity" from December 2015 to November 2017.

In its 2017 review, ACE identified the organization's focus on wild animal suffering and anti-speciesist advocacy as areas with potential for long-term impact. It also noted Animal Ethics' international volunteer network, translations of educational material, and academic outreach. However, ACE considered the organization's impact difficult to measure because its goals depended on changes in attitudes and the development of research that might only affect animals in the longer term.

ACE stated that Animal Ethics had made less observable progress towards its goals since the 2015 evaluation than it had hoped. It also expressed uncertainty about the effectiveness of some outreach methods, including leaflet distribution, and did not produce a quantitative cost-effectiveness estimate because the evidence was insufficient.

Raising for Effective Giving has described Animal Ethics as an anti-speciesist outreach organization concerned with long-term changes in attitudes towards animals and issues receiving comparatively little attention from other animal advocacy groups.

== See also ==
- List of animal rights groups
- Oxford Centre for Animal Ethics
- UPF-Centre for Animal Ethics
- Wild Animal Initiative
