= Relationship between animal ethics and environmental ethics =

Ethical debate concerning animals and ecosystems

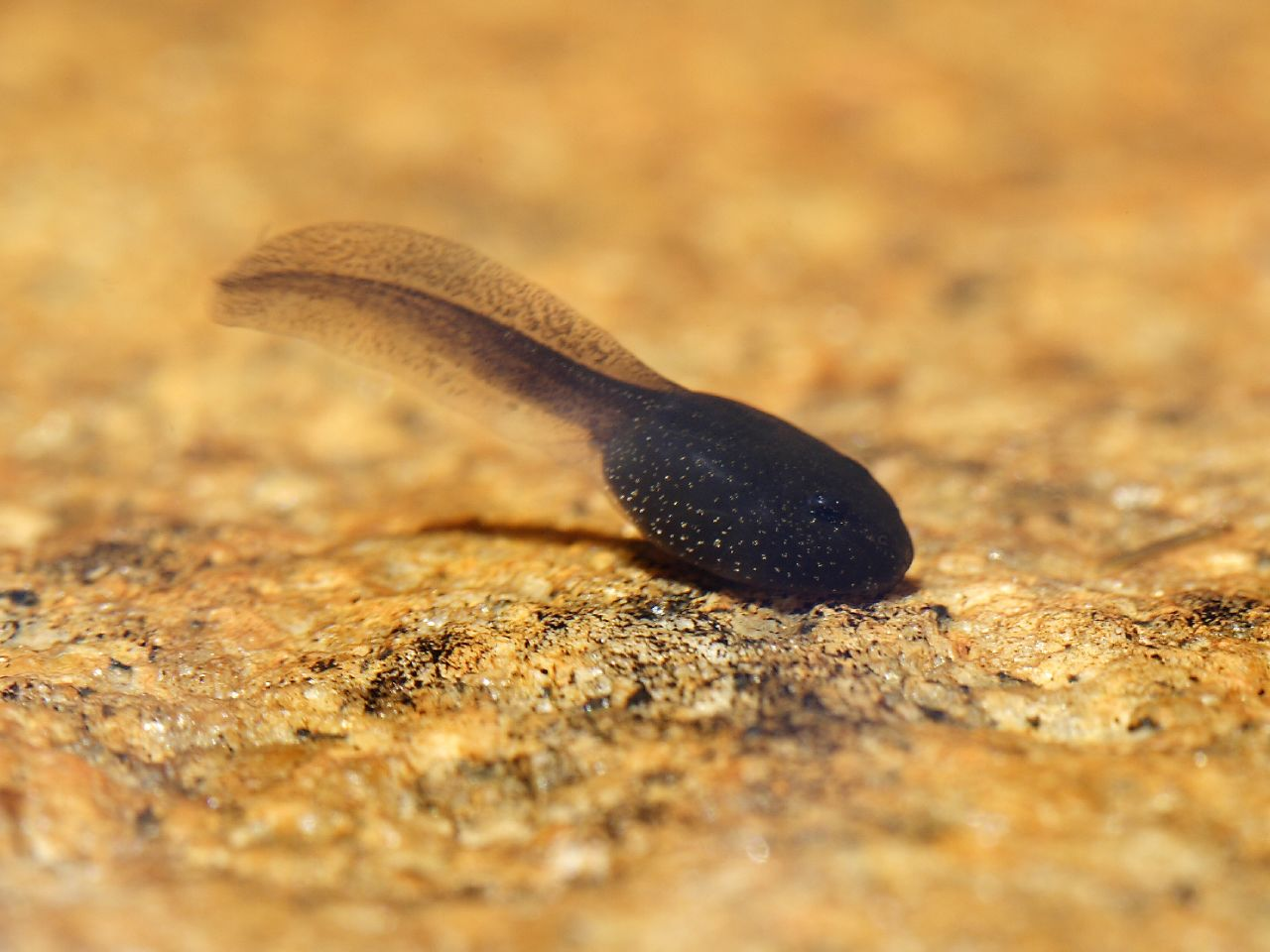
A tadpole, representing an individual animal

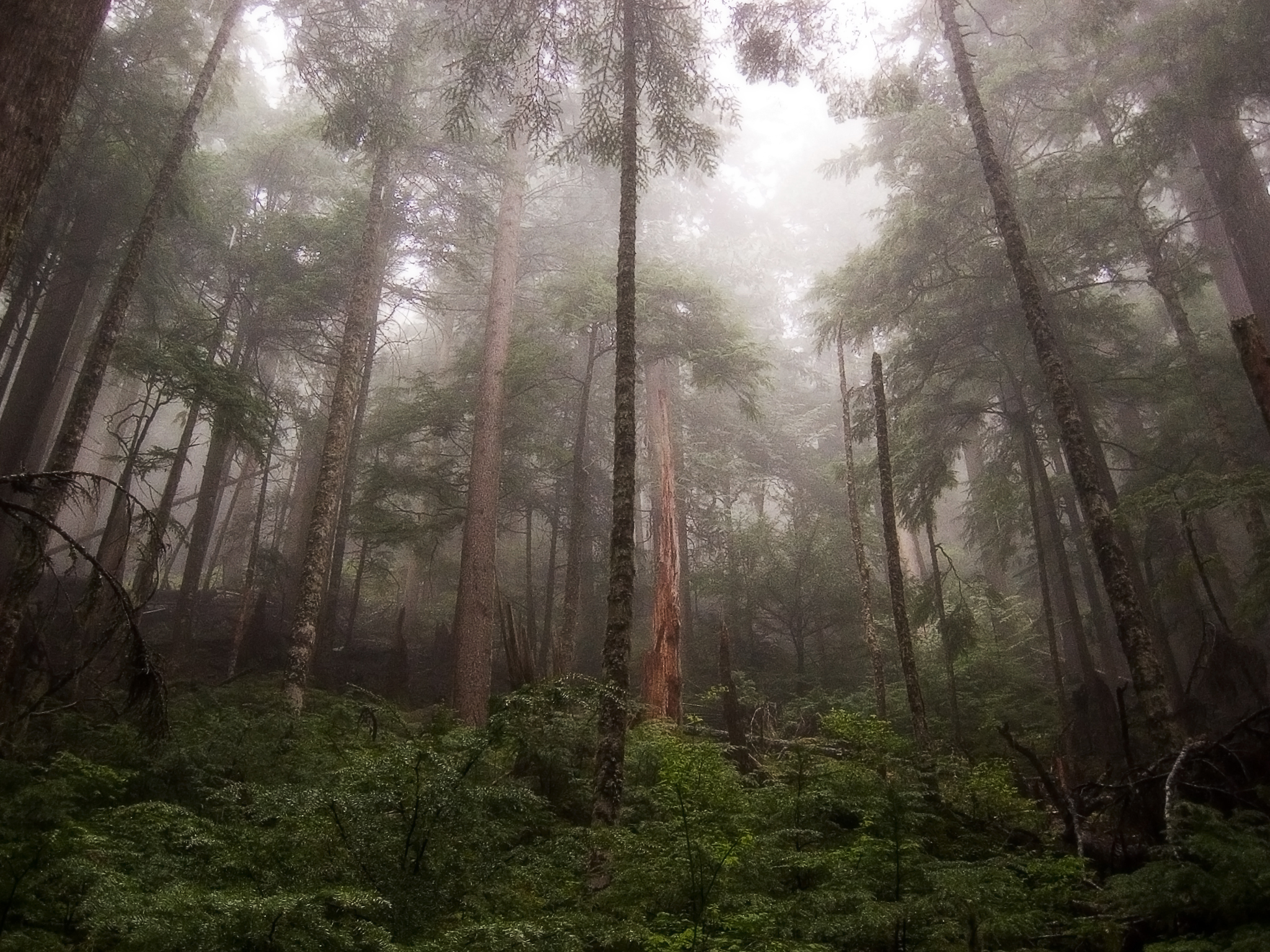
A rainforest, representing an ecosystem

The relationship between animal ethics and environmental ethics concerns how the interests of individual animals relate to the protection of species, populations, ecosystems and other components of the natural world. Animal ethics generally concerns the moral status and treatment of individual animals, particularly sentient beings, whereas environmental ethics also examines moral obligations towards ecological communities, species and nature more broadly.

The two fields share concerns about human treatment of animals and the natural environment but can lead to different conclusions about wildlife management, hunting, the control of introduced species and interventions to reduce wild animal suffering. Philosophers disagree over whether animal ethics and environmental ethics are fundamentally incompatible or can be reconciled.

== Overview ==
Animal ethicists commonly regard the well-being and interests of individual sentient animals as morally relevant in their own right. By contrast, some approaches to environmental ethics assign intrinsic value to species, ecological communities, biodiversity or natural processes, independently of their effects on individual animals. Animal ethicists may also value ecosystems and species, but some regard their value as primarily instrumental to the interests of sentient beings.

These differences become apparent in decisions about wildlife conservation. Conservation measures may involve removing or killing animals belonging to introduced species to protect endangered species, native populations or ecosystems. Such measures can be justified within environmental ethics by their contribution to conservation, while animal ethicists may object that they disregard the interests of the individual animals killed. The distinction between native and introduced species may therefore carry different moral weight depending on the ethical framework applied.

Similar disagreements concern hunting. Some environmental ethicists defend hunting when it contributes to ecological management or the conservation of animal populations, whereas animal ethicists may object to the suffering and death of the animals involved.

A further disagreement concerns whether humans should intervene in nature to reduce suffering caused by predation, disease, starvation and other natural processes. Some animal ethicists argue that the suffering of wild animals provides reasons for intervention, while environmental ethicists who value natural processes or ecological relationships may oppose such measures. The relationship between environmental protection and concern for animals has also been discussed in connection with vegetarianism, including the different reasons offered for avoiding animal products.

These disagreements do not necessarily apply to all forms of either ethical approach. Environmental ethics includes individualistic as well as holistic theories, and animal ethicists differ over the extent of human obligations towards wild animals. Some philosophers have argued that the apparent conflict results partly from treating the two fields as more uniform than they are.

== Perspectives ==
=== Animal ethicists ===
The animal rights philosopher Tom Regan, in his 1981 paper "The Nature and Possibility of an Environmental Ethic", examined the possibility of an environmental ethic in which "nonconscious natural objects can have value in their own right, independently of human interests".

In The Case for Animal Rights (1983), Regan criticised the implications of Aldo Leopold's land ethic, particularly the possibility that the interests of individual animals could be subordinated to the preservation of a biotic community. He argued that Leopold's approach could permit sacrificing individuals for the "greater biotic good" and described this implication as "environmental fascism".

The utilitarian philosopher Peter Singer, in Practical Ethics, argues for extending moral consideration to the interests of all sentient beings, including those belonging to future generations. His approach differs from environmental theories that assign intrinsic value to species or ecosystems independently of the experiences of sentient individuals.

In their 2019 paper "It's Splitsville: Why Animal Ethics and Environmental Ethics Are Incompatible", Catia Faria and Eze Paez argue that the two fields have incompatible criteria for determining which entities deserve moral consideration. They maintain that environmental ethics can conflict with the interests of sentient individuals and fails to give sufficient consideration to wild animal suffering. They conclude that animal ethics and environmental ethics cannot consistently be endorsed together and argue in favour of the former.

Oscar Horta has examined whether the disagreement is as extensive as some accounts suggest. In a 2018 paper, he argues that certain environmental theories, particularly biocentric approaches, can provide reasons to intervene in nature to reduce suffering. Horta distinguishes these from ecocentric and nature-centred approaches, which may oppose intervention when it threatens the values they seek to protect. He also identifies circumstances in which advocates of wild animal welfare and environmental protection could support similar policies.

==== Wild animal welfare and habitat destruction ====
Within discussions of wild animal suffering associated with effective altruism, Brian Tomasik has examined whether some forms of habitat destruction might reduce suffering by preventing the existence of animals whose lives would otherwise contain more suffering than well-being. His suffering-focused consequentialist approach gives weight to the expected effects of human actions on the experiences of individual animals rather than treating the preservation of habitats as an overriding objective.

The argument that reducing wild animal populations could be desirable if their lives are predominantly negative has been described as the "logic of the logger". Philosopher Jeff Sebo discusses this argument as a possible implication of utilitarianism, while questioning whether it would justify killing animals or destroying their habitats. Sebo argues that utilitarians have reasons to respect animal rights in practice and that the consequences of such interventions for animals, humans and the environment may undermine their supposed benefits.

The assumption that wild animals generally experience more suffering than well-being has also been questioned. In their 2023 paper "Positive Wild Animal Welfare", philosophers Heather Browning and Walter Veit argue that the evidence does not establish that wild animals typically have lives dominated by suffering. They examine the possibility that positive experiences may be more prevalent than some accounts recognise and call for further empirical research into the welfare of wild animals. They also caution that interventions intended to reduce suffering may inadvertently remove sources of positive welfare.

=== Environmental ethicists ===
J. Baird Callicott, in his 1980 paper "Animal Liberation: A Triangular Affair", argued that there were "intractable practical differences" between Leopold's land ethic and the ethical principles of the animal liberation movement. His argument concerned the conflict between obligations towards individual animals and the preservation of ecological communities.

Mark Sagoff made a similar argument in his 1984 paper "Animal Liberation and Environmental Ethics: Bad Marriage, Quick Divorce". He maintained that environmentalists and animal liberationists were committed to fundamentally different objectives, concluding that "[e]nvironmentalists cannot be animal liberationists. Animal liberationists cannot be environmentalists".

In a 1986 paper, "Wildlife Conservation and Animal Rights: Are They Compatible?", wildlife researchers Michael Hutchins and Christin Wemmer criticised the animal liberation movement's approach to conservation. They described it as "biologically illiterate and thus ill-equipped to provide an intelligent basis for wildlife conservation", arguing that animal rights philosophy faced difficulties when applied to wildlife management.

Callicott reconsidered his earlier position in "Animal Liberation and Environmental Ethics: Back Together Again" (1988). Although he continued to recognise philosophical differences between the two approaches, he argued that their advocates should cooperate in opposing activities harmful to animals and the natural environment. He wrote that it would be preferable to "make common cause against a common enemy" rather than continue their disagreements.

In a 1994 paper examining Holmes Rolston III's environmental ethics, Ned Hettinger addressed the predation problem as a possible implication of animal rights arguments against hunting. He suggested that if humans were prohibited from killing animals even for basic needs, animal advocates risked being committed to the view that predation by carnivorous animals was intrinsically wrong.

Other philosophers have disputed the division between animal and environmental ethics. Dale Jamieson, in "Animal Liberation is an Environmental Ethic" (1998), argues that animal liberation should itself be regarded as a form of environmental ethics rather than as a separate or opposing position.

In "Taxonomic Chauvinism, No More!" (2019), environmental philosopher Ricardo Rozzi criticised the tendency to favour certain groups of animals in ethical consideration. He argued for greater attention to invertebrates and questioned the exclusion of these animals from discussions of moral status.

The relationship between animal rights and biodiversity protection has also been examined in international environmental law. In a 2024 paper, Werner Scholtz considers the potential conflict between rights for individual wild animals and obligations under the Convention on Biological Diversity to control invasive species. He argues that recognising rights for wild animals does not necessarily prohibit the removal of invasive species and proposes a framework of rights specifically applicable to wild animals.

== See also ==
- Animal consciousness
- Compassionate conservation
- Ethics of uncertain sentience
- Intrinsic value
- Opposition to hunting
- Sentientism
- Speciesism
- Welfare biology
- Wildlife management
