= Dansk Vegetarisk Forening =

Danish vegetarian and vegan organisation

- Abbreviation: DVF
- Formation: 11 December 1896; 129 years ago
- Type: Vegetarian and vegan association
- Purpose: Promotion of vegetarian and other plant-based diets
- Headquarters: Copenhagen, Denmark
- Region served: Denmark
- Members: 4,000 (2020)
- Secretary general: Rune-Christoffer Dragsdahl
- Website: vegetarisk.dk
- Formerly called: Dansk Vegetarianerforening

The Dansk Vegetarisk Forening (English: Danish Vegetarian Association; DVF) is a Danish association for vegetarians, vegans and others who support a plant-based diet. It was founded on 11 December 1896 as Dansk Vegetarianerforening and is based in Copenhagen. The association organises activities for vegetarians, vegans, and others interested in a plant-based lifestyle, publishes the members' magazine Vegetarisk!, and works with businesses, researchers, politicians, authorities and other organisations on issues related to plant-based food systems in Denmark. In 2023 and 2024, the DVF was a party to legal proceedings concerning the marketing of pork products by Danish Crown, including the use of claims such as "climate-controlled pig".

== History ==
The DVF was founded on 11 December 1896 under the name Dansk Vegetarianerforening ("Danish Vegetarian Association"). The association's first chairman was the then municipal doctor in Copenhagen, Dr. Michael Larsen, who later wrote the book Naturhelbredelsen ("The Nature Cure").

== Aims ==
The association's vision is described on the association's website as "to create a sustainable, ethical and healthy plant-based food system" and "to promote plant-based food through knowledge sharing, collaboration and action".

The association aims, among other things:

- to promote the spread of vegetarian lifestyles
- to provide information about vegetarian nutrition, including that a vegetarian diet is fully nutritionally adequate
- to provide information about the benefits of cutting back on meat and animal products, both for animals and humans and for the sake of global sustainability
- to promote the vegetarian offering in restaurants, institutions, etc.
- to carry out activities for members based on a vegetarian lifestyle
- to promote the spread of sustainable, plant-based forms of agriculture, including e.g. organic farming, permaculture and the like, for the sake of animals, humans and global sustainability

== Activities ==
The DVF arranges a number of activities for vegetarians and others who are interested in a plant-based lifestyle. The association publishes a members' magazine called Vegetarisk! ("Vegetarian!") and members receive a membership card that gives access to a number of discounts at cafes, restaurants and shops.

The association promotes the spread of vegetarian living via social media, leaflet distribution and larger projects such as the association's school project, where school ambassadors go to schools and hold workshops on food and sustainability. The DVF is also considered the primary voice for vegetarians and vegans in Denmark, and the association regularly has debates in written Danish media and the association's secretary general Rune-Christoffer Dragsdahl also frequently participates in radio and television programs. The DVF is one of the most central players in Denmark in the field of plant-based diets and collaborates widely with business, researchers, politicians, authorities and other organizations to promote the green agenda.

The association experienced a major increase in membership after the turn of the millennium, and as of 31 December 2020, the DVF had approximately 4,000 members.

== Legal case against Danish Crown ==
In November and December 2023, the DVF was one of the plaintiffs when the Western High Court heard a case alleging consumer misrepresentation in connection with the marketing of pork from Danish Crown. The case revolved around the terms "climate-controlled pig" and "Danish pig is more climate-friendly than you think".

On 1 March, the High Court found that Danish Crown A/S had violated Section 5 of the Marketing Act on misleading marketing in connection with the use of the term "climate-controlled pig", and the High Court therefore upheld the claim of the DVF and the Climate Movement in Denmark. On the other hand, Danish Crown was acquitted of the claim that "Danish pig is more climate-friendly than you think", as the claim, after an overall assessment, could not be considered misleading within the meaning of Section 5 of the Marketing Act.

The DVF and the Climate Movement appealed the judgment to the Supreme Court, but before the case could be heard, Danish Crown acknowledged in a confirmatory response that it had violated the Marketing Act. Thus, the DVF and the Climate Movement were fully successful in their case.
