= Economic Society of Australia =

Organization for Australian economists

The Economic Society of Australia (ESA) is the peak body for Australian economists. It was established in 1925 and has branches in all states and the ACT. The current president is Matthew Butlin from Victoria

The ESA gives the Young Economist Award every two years to recognise the contributions of an economist under the age of 40. Previous winners have included the Hon Dr Andrew Leigh, Professor Paul Frijters, and Professor Joshua Ganns.

The ESA also hosts an eminent speaker series, which has included talks from Deirdre McCloskey, Professor Jagdish Bhagwati, Joseph Stiglitz, Mary Morgan among many others.

It produces two major publications The Economic Record (1925–) and Economic Papers.
