= Welfare biology =

Proposed field studying the welfare of living beings

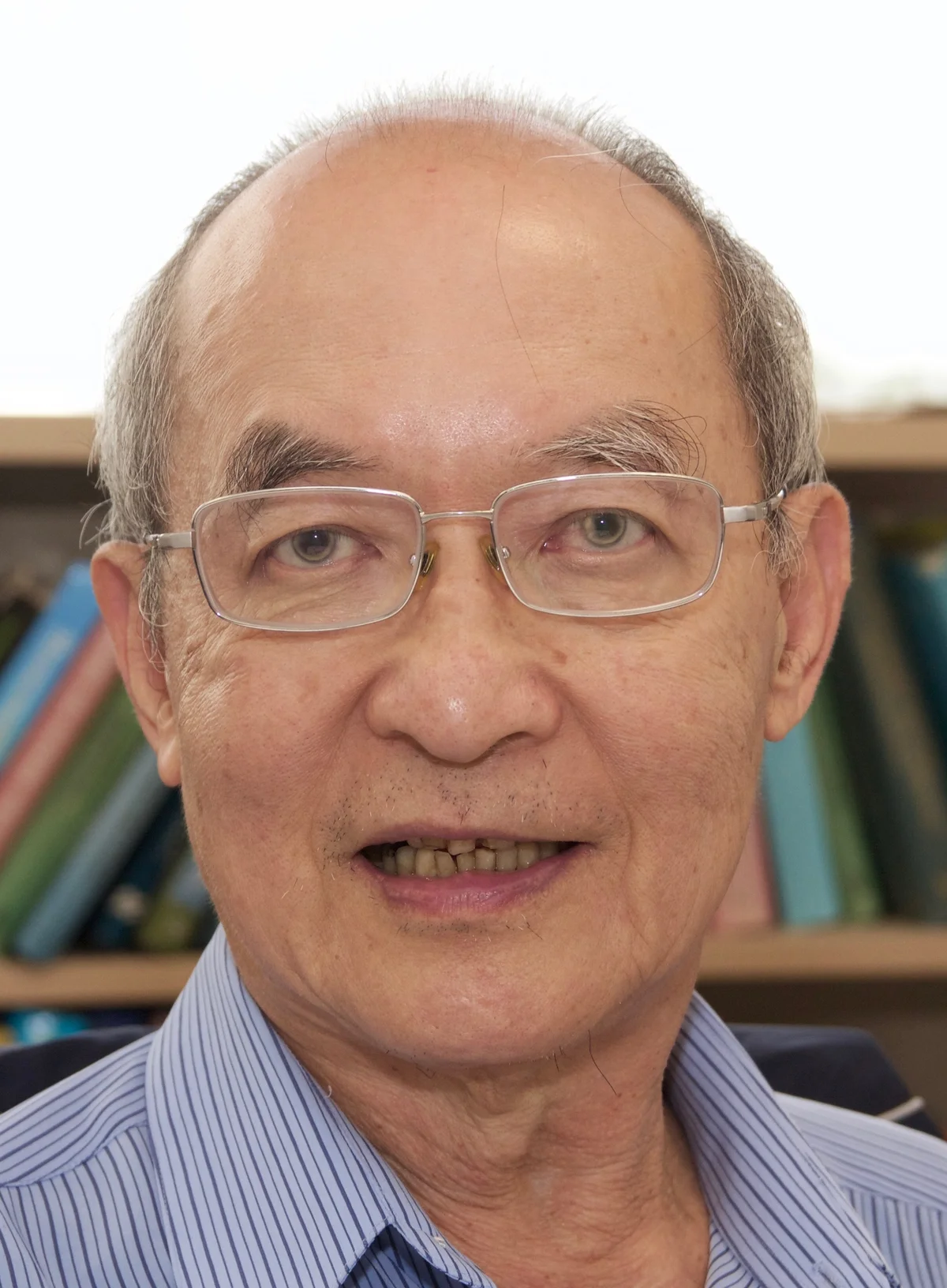
Yew-Kwang Ng, who proposed welfare biology in 1995

Welfare biology is a proposed interdisciplinary field studying the welfare of living beings in relation to their environment. The economist Yew-Kwang Ng proposed it in 1995, defining welfare as enjoyment minus suffering and combining welfare economics with evolutionary biology to investigate the effects of natural processes on sentient individuals.

The proposal has been discussed in animal ethics, animal welfare science, ecology and research on wild animal suffering. It includes the study of wild animals, whose individual welfare has received comparatively little attention in conventional animal welfare research. Proposed subjects of investigation include population dynamics, life history, habitat conditions and the effects of environmental change. Researchers disagree on whether welfare biology should be a separate discipline or an extension of existing animal welfare science.

== Development ==
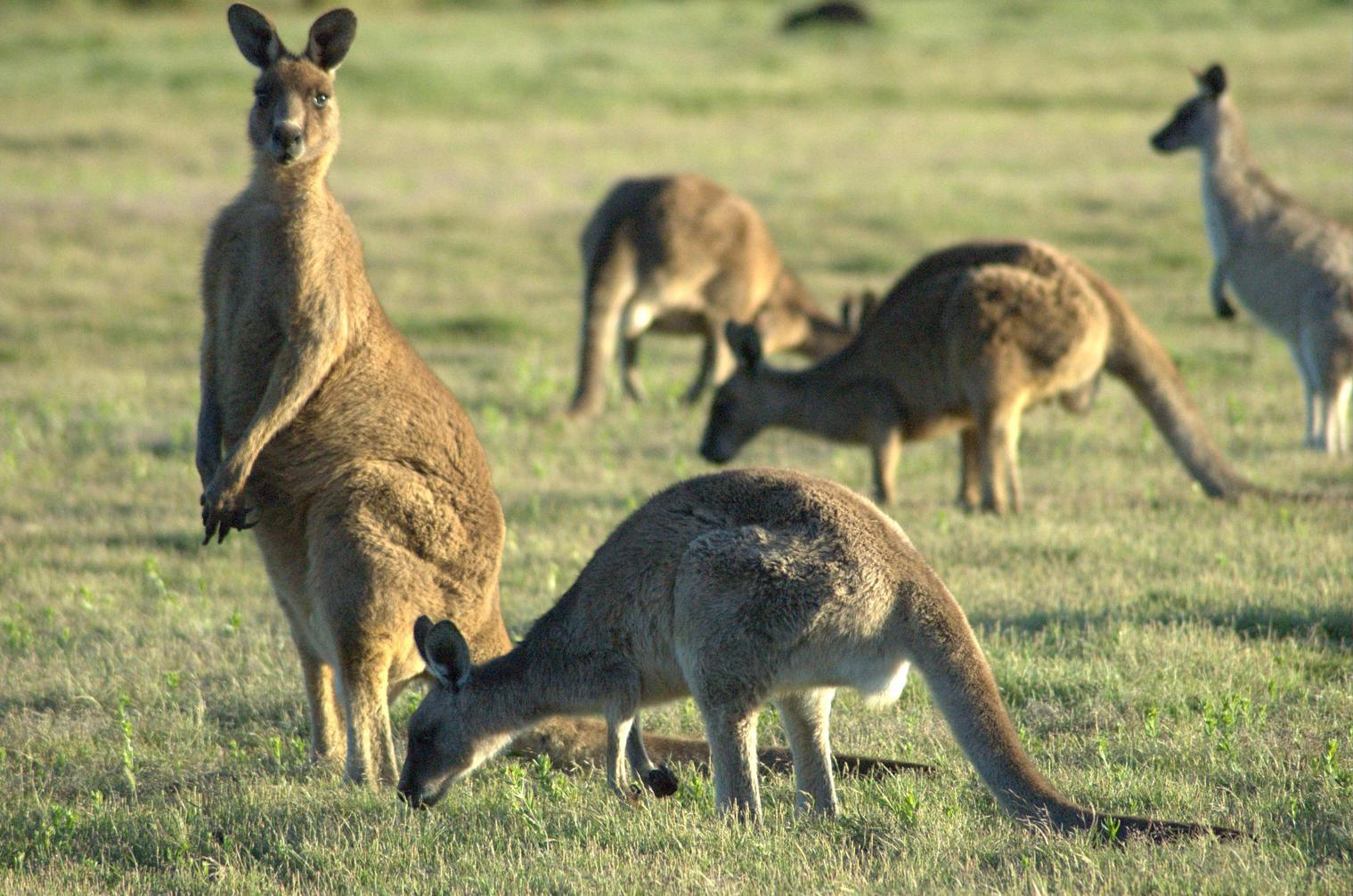
Kangaroos were the subject of a 2006 study applying welfare biology to wildlife population management.

In his 1995 paper "Towards welfare biology: Evolutionary economics of animal consciousness and suffering", Yew-Kwang Ng defined welfare biology as the "study of living things and their environment with respect to their welfare (defined as net happiness, or enjoyment minus suffering)". He distinguished "affective sentients", capable of pleasure or pain, from "non-affective sentients", which perceive their surroundings without positive or negative feelings and therefore have no welfare under his definition. On the basis of a model of evolutionary dynamics, Ng argued that suffering was likely to exceed enjoyment in nature.

In 2006, Matthew Clarke and Ng applied welfare biology to the culling of kangaroos at Puckapunyal, Australia. Treating kangaroos as affective sentients, they assessed the costs, benefits and welfare consequences of population management. Their analysis suggested that culling could be justified in some circumstances, although preventive measures might be preferable. That year, economists Thomas Eichner and Rudiger Pethig examined Ng's approach in a study of non-anthropocentric nature protection. They noted difficulties in identifying suitable measures of organism welfare, which they related to the early development of welfare biology.

In 2016, Ng suggested that welfare biology could help investigate animal feelings and address methodological problems discussed by Marian Dawkins. He also proposed improvements to conditions for captive animals. Responding to Ng, Sayma H. Chowdhury and Todd K. Shackelford favoured preventing captive animals from breeding over improving their living conditions, arguing that this would avoid the suffering of animals who would otherwise be born.

Ng and Zach Groff re-examined the original model in 2019 and found an error that invalidated its conclusion that suffering generally exceeds enjoyment in nature. Once corrected, the model could not establish which was greater. They also found that the relationship between reproductive failure and welfare varied according to other characteristics of a species, and called for further empirical research.

By 2020, welfare biology had not become an established scientific discipline, as environmental economists Alexis Carlier and Nicolas Treich observed. They discussed its potential use in economic assessments of animal welfare. Organisations including Animal Ethics and Wild Animal Initiative have advocated research into the welfare of wild animals.

Heather Browning and Walter Veit questioned the evidence that suffering generally exceeds enjoyment in the lives of wild animals in their 2023 paper "Positive Wild Animal Welfare". They suggested that wild animals' welfare may be more positive than commonly assumed, but left the overall balance unresolved. They called for empirical methods to assess positive and negative experiences across different species and life stages.

=== Relationship with animal welfare science ===
Asher Soryl, Andrew J. Moore, Philip J. Seddon and Mike R. King called for a separate discipline of welfare biology in their 2021 paper "The Case for Welfare Biology". They argued that animal welfare science had largely concentrated on animals under human care, while ecology focused on populations, species and ecological processes. Their proposed discipline would study the welfare of all beings capable of having welfare, regardless of their relationship with humans.

In contrast, Veit and Browning argued in 2021 that existing animal welfare science could be extended to wild animals without creating a separate discipline. They criticised Ng's original evolutionary model but supported his proposal to study welfare in nature.

The term wild animal welfare science (WAWS) is used for research on the welfare of free-living animals and is sometimes used interchangeably with welfare biology. Vittoria Elliott and colleagues described wild animal welfare science in 2026 as an emerging interdisciplinary field. They proposed studying wild animals' subjective experiences and the effects of environmental conditions on welfare, with possible applications in wildlife management and conservation.

=== Research programmes ===
In September 2022, New York University established its Wild Animal Welfare Program, co-directed by Becca Franks and Jeff Sebo. The programme studies the effects of human activities and environmental change on wild animal welfare and organises academic events. In June 2026, it held a two-day summit bringing together researchers to discuss welfare assessment, wildlife management, conservation, and related subjects.

Wild Animal Initiative has funded studies of welfare assessment methods and the effects of environmental conditions on wild animals. In September 2025, the organisation reported that it had awarded 84 research grants since establishing its grants programme in 2022. In June 2026, it announced funding for 13 additional projects, including studies of welfare indicators in wild insects, urban rats, amphibians, and other animals.

== Ethical basis ==
Some animal ethicists argue that sentient animals' interests deserve consideration whether their suffering results from human activity or natural processes. On this view, there are moral reasons to study suffering among wild animals and, where possible, reduce it.

Stijn Bruers argues that ecosystems cannot suffer or have interests of their own, but sentient animals have interests in their welfare. He questions conservation measures that prioritise biodiversity regardless of their effects on individual animals. Bruers and Philipp Ryf have argued that resources devoted to conservation biology should instead be directed towards research concerned with animal welfare.

Adriano Mannino argues that proposals to help wild animals must be assessed for feasibility and possible consequences. He recommends extended small-scale trials before undertaking interventions on a larger scale.

Ronald Sandler and Clare Palmer reviewed proposals to make individual wild animal welfare the principal objective of ecosystem management in 2025. They distinguished these proposals from compassionate conservation, which seeks to limit harm during conservation activities while retaining conservation objectives. Their review examined conflicts between individual welfare and the protection of biodiversity, ecological processes and species, as well as objections to prioritising welfare in ecosystem management.

== Research directions ==
Research proposed for welfare biology draws on ecology, population biology and animal welfare science. These include combining demographic data, such as age-specific survival rates, with assessments of animal welfare, and studying animals' behavioural and physiological responses to environmental conditions.

Wild Animal Initiative divides its proposed research agenda into foundational studies of wild animals' lives, the development of methods for measuring their welfare, and investigations of the effects of interventions. These include interventions undertaken for wildlife management, conservation, and other purposes.

Luke Hecht and Matthew Allcock have proposed using life history theory to investigate how habitat fragmentation affects wild animal welfare. They suggested that species may differ in their vulnerability to changes in habitat structure according to their reproductive and survival strategies.

Hecht also proposed using demographic data, including age-specific survival and reproductive rates, to investigate wild animal welfare. These data are already collected in population ecology and biodiversity conservation and could help study populations for which direct welfare assessments are unavailable.

Jara Gutiérrez and Javier de Miguel reviewed the effects of wildfires on individual animals in 2021, including injury, stress, disease, displacement and mortality. They identified ecological research relevant to assessing welfare and called for further studies of rescue, rehabilitation and responses to fire.

Laura Bernard's 2020 master's thesis considered incorporating welfare biology into rewilding projects, including through cooperation among local communities, conservationists, authorities and policymakers.

In The Routledge Handbook of Animal Ethics (2019), Catia Faria and Oscar Horta proposed developing welfare biology either by extending existing animal welfare science to animals outside human care or by incorporating individual welfare assessments into ecology. They attributed the limited attention paid to individual animal welfare in the life sciences partly to speciesism and environmental approaches that prioritise species or ecosystems.

=== Welfare assessment methods ===
Wild animal welfare assessments must account for the relationship between animals' subjective experiences and observable conditions, health and behaviour. Survival, reproductive success and physical condition can be measured, but these measures alone do not establish whether an animal's experiences are positive or negative.

Michaël Beaulieu reviewed physiological indicators of wild animal welfare in 2024. Such measurements can provide information across environments and over time, but he cautioned that physiological responses do not always correspond directly to subjective experiences. He recommended validating physiological measures against other indicators and using several indicators together.

Beaulieu and Michaela Masilkova also examined biologging, which uses devices attached to animals to record data. They considered how measurements of movement, behaviour, physiology and environmental conditions might contribute to welfare assessments, provided the measurements could be shown to indicate welfare reliably.

Kristen Hirst and Samniqueka Halsey proposed a severity index for bacterial diseases affecting wildlife in 2025. It combines clinical signs, affected body systems and aspects of animal welfare to estimate the severity of different host–pathogen relationships. They applied it to an existing database of bacterial diseases in wild mammals, birds and reptiles.

Simon Eckerström Liedholm reviewed studies of injuries and deformities in wild fish in 2026. The studies reported an average prevalence of 15%, but covered a limited range of species and populations and were not representative of wild fish generally. He proposed assessing the welfare effects of external injuries and deformities alongside other indicators.

In their 2026 account of wild animal welfare science, Elliott and colleagues identified the development and validation of welfare indicators as a research priority. They also discussed using existing ecological research and cooperation among animal welfare scientists, ecologists and other specialists.

=== Applications and interventions ===
Proposed applications of welfare biology include assessing how wildlife management, disease control, habitat restoration and conservation affect individual animals. Wild Animal Initiative has proposed comparing the welfare consequences of different population-control methods and assessing interventions such as vaccination, parasite control, and the release of rehabilitated animals. Its research agenda also calls for studying effects on animals other than those directly targeted by an intervention.

Oscar Horta and Iria Murado-Carballo examined wildlife health interventions in relation to One Health in 2026. They noted that vaccination, medical treatment and parasite-control programmes had generally been undertaken for human health or conservation purposes, and argued that benefits to the treated animals' own welfare provided a further reason to undertake and expand them.

Holly Elmore and William McAuliffe of Rethink Priorities examined five organisations working on wild animal welfare in 2024. They found that the organisations concentrated on academic outreach and had carried out few direct interventions. The authors identified welfare measurement, technical capacity and stakeholder cooperation as requirements for interventions on a large scale, and warned of unintended harms from poorly understood measures.

== Urban welfare ecology ==
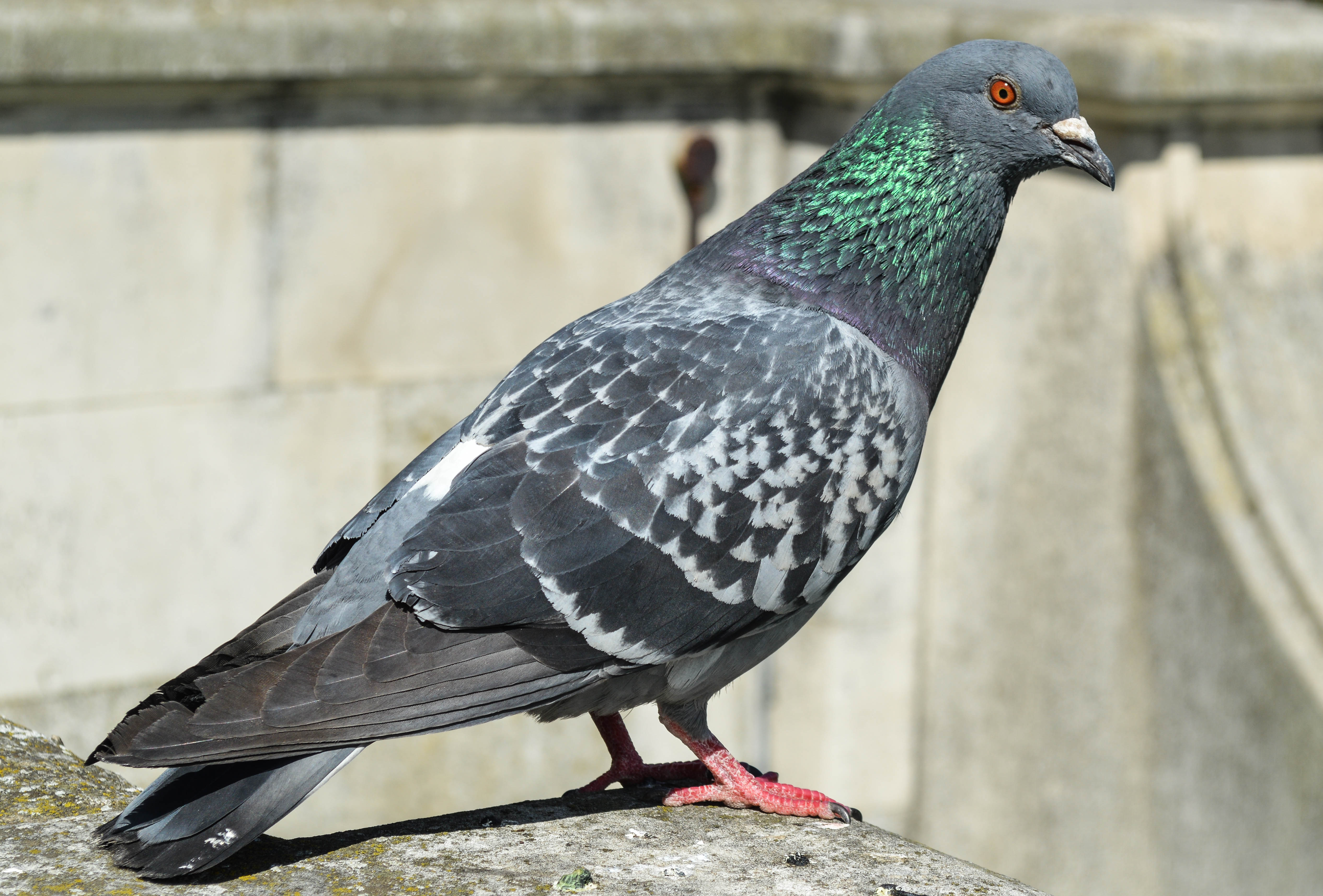
Feral pigeons are among the animals whose welfare could be studied within urban welfare ecology.

Faria and Horta proposed urban welfare ecology as a subdiscipline of welfare biology concerned with animals in urban, suburban and industrial environments. They argued that research on these animals had generally addressed their effects on humans, ecological roles and conservation, with less attention to their individual welfare.

They proposed studying how urban conditions affect animals' experiences and what measures could improve their welfare. Because human activity already has extensive effects in these environments, Faria and Horta considered them possible sites for small-scale interventions. Studies could draw on existing research in urban ecology, animal behaviour and population biology.

A 2026 symposium review by Bonnie Fairbanks Flint and colleagues examined welfare research on urban wild animals and the use of ecological studies to inform welfare assessments and wildlife management.

== See also ==
- Animal consciousness
- Compassionate conservation
- Conservation welfare
- Ethics of uncertain sentience
- Pain in animals
- Relationship between animal ethics and environmental ethics
- Sentientism
- Speciesism
- Wildlife management
