= Bibliography of animal rights =

The following is a bibliography of animal rights. It includes primary, secondary, and tertiary works on the moral and legal status of non-human animals, animal welfare, animal experimentation, vegetarianism, veganism, speciesism, and related social movements. Charles R. Magel's 1989 Keyguide to Information Sources in Animal Rights describes the modern animal rights movement as beginning in the early 1970s, while identifying earlier writers such as Pythagoras, Plutarch, Porphyry, Thomas Tryon, Lewis Gompertz, Anna Kingsford, Frances Power Cobbe, Henry Stephens Salt, J. Howard Moore, and Albert Schweitzer as precursors.

== Reference works ==
- Magel, Charles R. (1981). Bibliography on Animal Rights and Related Matters. University Press of America.
- Magel, Charles R. (1989). Keyguide to Information Sources in Animal Rights. London: Mansell Publishing. ISBN 0-7201-1984-7.
- Bekoff, Marc, ed. (1998). Encyclopedia of Animal Rights and Animal Welfare. Westport, Connecticut: Greenwood Press.
- Bekoff, Marc, ed. (2010). Encyclopedia of Animal Rights and Animal Welfare (2nd ed.). Westport, Connecticut: Greenwood Press.
- Marcoux, Mary F., ed. (2000). Animal Rights: A Subject Guide, Bibliography, and Internet Companion. Santa Barbara, California: ABC-CLIO.

== History ==
=== Books ===
- Salt, Henry Stephens (1892). Animals' Rights: Considered in Relation to Social Progress. London: George Bell & Sons.
- Leffingwell, Albert (1916). An Ethical Problem: Or, Sidelights upon Scientific Experimentation on Man and Animals. New York: C. P. Farrell.
- French, Richard D. (1975). Antivivisection and Medical Science in Victorian Society. Princeton, New Jersey: Princeton University Press.
- Ryder, Richard D. (1989). Animal Revolution: Changing Attitudes Towards Speciesism. Oxford: Basil Blackwell.
- Ritvo, Harriet (1987). The Animal Estate: The English and Other Creatures in the Victorian Age. Cambridge, Massachusetts: Harvard University Press.
- Turner, James (1980). Reckoning with the Beast: Animals, Pain, and Humanity in the Victorian Mind. Baltimore: Johns Hopkins University Press.
- Preece, Rod (2011). Animal Sensibility and Inclusive Justice in the Age of Bernard Shaw. Vancouver: UBC Press.
- Kean, Hilda (1998). Animal Rights: Political and Social Change in Britain since 1800. London: Reaktion Books.
- Li, Chien-hui (2019). Mobilizing Traditions in the First Wave of the British Animal Defense Movement. London: Palgrave Macmillan. ISBN 978-1-137-52650-2.
- Guerrini, Anita (2003). Experimenting with Humans and Animals: From Galen to Animal Rights. Baltimore: Johns Hopkins University Press.

== Philosophy and ethics ==
=== Historical works ===
- Plutarch (100s). Moralia.
- Porphyry (300s). On Abstinence from Animal Food.
- Tryon, Thomas (1683). The Way to Health, Long Life and Happiness. London.
- Gompertz, Lewis (1992) [1824]. Moral Inquiries on the Situation of Man and of Brutes. Fontwell: Centaur Press.
- Bentham, Jeremy (1789). An Introduction to the Principles of Morals and Legislation.
- Schopenhauer, Arthur (1840). On the Basis of Morality.
- Kingsford, Anna (1881). The Perfect Way in Diet. London: Kegan Paul, Trench & Co.
- Moore, J. Howard (1906). The Universal Kinship. Chicago: Charles H. Kerr & Co.
- Moore, J. Howard (1907). The New Ethics. London: Ernest Bell.
- Schweitzer, Albert (1923). The Philosophy of Civilization. London: A. & C. Black.

=== Modern works ===
- Godlovitch, Stanley; Godlovitch, Roslind; Harris, John, eds. (1971). Animals, Men and Morals: An Inquiry into the Maltreatment of Non-humans. London: Victor Gollancz.
- Singer, Peter (1975). Animal Liberation. New York: New York Review/Random House.
- Regan, Tom (1983). The Case for Animal Rights. Berkeley: University of California Press.
- Rollin, Bernard E. (1981). Animal Rights and Human Morality. Buffalo, New York: Prometheus Books.
- Clark, Stephen R. L. (1977). The Moral Status of Animals. Oxford: Clarendon Press.
- Midgley, Mary (1983). Animals and Why They Matter. Athens, Georgia: University of Georgia Press.
- Sapontzis, Steve F. (1987). Morals, Reason, and Animals. Philadelphia: Temple University Press.
- Frey, R. G. (1983). Rights, Killing, and Suffering: Moral Vegetarianism and Applied Ethics. Oxford: Basil Blackwell.
- Francione, Gary L. (1995). Animals, Property, and the Law. Philadelphia: Temple University Press.
- Francione, Gary L. (2000). Introduction to Animal Rights: Your Child or the Dog?. Philadelphia: Temple University Press.
- Gruen, Lori (2011). Ethics and Animals: An Introduction. Cambridge: Cambridge University Press.
- Donaldson, Sue; Kymlicka, Will (2011). Zoopolis: A Political Theory of Animal Rights. Oxford: Oxford University Press.
- Garner, Robert (2013). A Theory of Justice for Animals: Animal Rights in a Nonideal World. Oxford: Oxford University Press.
- Cochrane, Alasdair (2012). Animal Rights without Liberation: Applied Ethics and Human Obligations. New York: Columbia University Press.
- Korsgaard, Christine M. (2018). Fellow Creatures: Our Obligations to the Other Animals. Oxford: Oxford University Press.

=== Articles ===
- Singer, Peter (5 April 1973). "Animal liberation". The New York Review of Books.
- Regan, Tom (1975). "The Moral Basis of Vegetarianism" (PDF). Canadian Journal of Philosophy. 5 (2): 181–214.
- Nagel, Thomas (1974). "What Is It Like to Be a Bat?" (PDF). The Philosophical Review. 83 (4): 435–450.
- Goodpaster, Kenneth E. (1978). "On being morally considerable". The Journal of Philosophy. 75 (6): 308–325.

== Animal experimentation ==
=== Books ===
- Ryder, Richard D. (1975). Victims of Science: The Use of Animals in Research. London: Davis-Poynter.
- Sharpe, Robert (1988). The Cruel Deception: The Use of Animals in Medical Research. Wellingborough: Thorsons.
- Finsen, Lawrence; Finsen, Susan (1994). The Animal Rights Movement in America: From Compassion to Respect. New York: Twayne Publishers.
- Orlans, F. Barbara (1993). In the Name of Science: Issues in Responsible Animal Experimentation. New York: Oxford University Press.
- Greek, C. Ray; Greek, Jean Swingle (2000). Sacred Cows and Golden Geese: The Human Cost of Experiments on Animals. New York: Continuum.
- Monamy, Vaughan (2000). Animal Experimentation: A Guide to the Issues. Cambridge: Cambridge University Press.

=== Articles and chapters ===
- Ryder, Richard D. (1971). "Experiments on animals". Animals, Men and Morals.
- Guerrini, Anita (1989). "Animal experiments and anti-vivisection debates in the 1820s". Journal of the History of Biology. 22 (1): 85–105.
- LaFollette, Hugh; Shanks, Niall (1996). "Brute science: Dilemmas of animal experimentation". Routledge.
- Cohen, Carl (1986). "The case for the use of animals in biomedical research". The New England Journal of Medicine. 315 (14): 865–870.
- Regan, Tom (1986). "The case for animal rights". Advances in Animal Welfare Science: 179–189.
- Donald, Diana (2020). "Animals, women and anti-vivisection". Women against Cruelty: Protection of Animals in Nineteenth-Century Britain. Manchester: Manchester University Press.

== Law ==
- Favre, David S. (2008). Animal Law: Welfare, Interests, and Rights. New York: Wolters Kluwer.
- Francione, Gary L. (1995). Animals, Property, and the Law. Philadelphia: Temple University Press.
- Wise, Steven M. (2000). Rattling the Cage: Toward Legal Rights for Animals. Cambridge, Massachusetts: Perseus Books.
- Wise, Steven M. (2002). Drawing the Line: Science and the Case for Animal Rights. Cambridge, Massachusetts: Perseus Books.
- Sunstein, Cass R.; Nussbaum, Martha C. (2004). Animal Rights: Current Debates and New Directions. Oxford: Oxford University Press.
- Peters, Anne (2020). Studies in Global Animal Law. Berlin: Springer.
- Fasel, Raffael; Butler, Sean C. (23 February 2023). Animal Rights Law. Bloomsbury.

== Religion ==
- Linzey, Andrew (1976). Animal Rights: A Christian Assessment of Man's Treatment of Animals. London: SCM Press.
- Linzey, Andrew (1987). Christianity and the Rights of Animals. New York: Crossroad.
- Preece, Rod (1999). Animals and Nature: Cultural Myths, Cultural Realities. Vancouver: UBC Press.
- Waldau, Paul; Patton, Kimberley, eds. (2006). A Communion of Subjects: Animals in Religion, Science, and Ethics. New York: Columbia University Press.
- Waldau, Paul (2011). Animal Rights: What Everyone Needs to Know. Oxford: Oxford University Press.
- Kemmerer, Lisa (2012). Animals and World Religions. Oxford: Oxford University Press.

== Feminism and social theory ==
- Adams, Carol J. (1990). The Sexual Politics of Meat: A Feminist-Vegetarian Critical Theory. New York: Continuum.
- Adams, Carol J.; Donovan, Josephine (1995). Animals and Women: Feminist Theoretical Explorations. Durham, North Carolina: Duke University Press.
- Donovan, Josephine; Adams, Carol J. (2007). The Feminist Care Tradition in Animal Ethics. New York: Columbia University Press.
- Nibert, David (2002). Animal Rights/Human Rights: Entanglements of Oppression and Liberation. Lanham, Maryland: Rowman & Littlefield.
- Twine, Richard (2010). Animals as Biotechnology: Ethics, Sustainability and Critical Animal Studies. London: Earthscan.
- Taylor, Sunaura (2017). Beasts of Burden: Animal and Disability Liberation. New York: The New Press.

== Environmental ethics ==
- Leopold, Aldo (1949). A Sand County Almanac. New York: Oxford University Press.
- Callicott, J. Baird (1989). In Defense of the Land Ethic: Essays in Environmental Philosophy. Albany: State University of New York Press.
- Taylor, Paul W. (1986). Respect for Nature: A Theory of Environmental Ethics. Princeton, New Jersey: Princeton University Press.
- Regan, Tom (1983). The Case for Animal Rights. Berkeley: University of California Press.
- Wenz, Peter S. (1988). Environmental Justice. Albany: State University of New York Press.

== See also ==
- Animal ethics
- Animal law
- Animal liberation movement
- Animal rights movement
- Animal welfare
- Bibliography of veganism and vegetarianism
- Critical animal studies
- History of animal rights
- Speciesism
