= Association for Promoting Rational Humanity towards the Animal Creation =

British animal welfare organisation (1830–1833)

- First page of the Association's prospectus, 1836
- Abbreviation: APRHAC
- Formation: 1830; 196 years ago
- Type: Animal welfare organisation
- Publication: The Voice of Humanity

The Association for Promoting Rational Humanity towards the Animal Creation (APRHAC) was a British animal welfare organisation established in 1830 and active until 1833. Alongside the Society for the Prevention of Cruelty to Animals (SPCA) and the Animals' Friend Society, it was involved in the early nineteenth-century British movement against cruelty to animals. Its activities included petitioning Parliament, publicising cruelty, promoting religious instruction on the treatment of animals, and campaigning against abuses at Smithfield Market, slaughterhouses and knackers' yards. It also criticised hunting practices.

The Association based its work on Christian principles and included several clergymen among its officers. It published the quarterly periodical The Voice of Humanity from 1830 to 1833 and had at least four local branches by 1832.

== History ==
The Association was established in 1830, six years after the founding of the SPCA. It was among the organisations engaged in educational campaigns, parliamentary petitions, investigations and prosecutions during the early animal-protection movement in Britain.

By 1832, the Association had at least four local branches, including one established in Cambridge in 1831. The Reverend Thomas Greenwood of Trinity College, Cambridge, whom historian Chien-hui Li identifies as a leading figure in the Association, advocated animal protection in terms of Christian duty and British patriotism. In his sermon "On National Cruelty", published in The Voice of Humanity in 1830, Greenwood urged Christians and British patriots to oppose cruelty to animals.

The Association encountered financial difficulties during its existence. Publication of The Voice of Humanity ceased after its third volume in 1833. According to a prospectus published in 1836, expenditure on the Association's campaigns and publications had exceeded its income, leaving it in debt. An audit in July 1834 found that most of the debt had been cleared, but the Association was no longer soliciting subscriptions and publication had not resumed.

Corey Lee Wrenn dates the Association's dissolution to 1833. Its 1836 prospectus referred to it as the "Late Association", confirming that it was no longer active by that year.

== Christian principles ==
The Association explicitly based its work on Christianity. In its 1832 annual report, its committee declared that there could be no "true humanity" without Christian principles.

Clergymen occupied several positions within the organisation. Five of its ten committee members in 1832 were clergy. The Cambridge branch had nine committee members, five of whom were clergymen, including at least four Anglicans.

According to Li, the Association's religious outlook was connected with its support for Christianity and the established social order. Greenwood's sermons appealed to national pride as well as religious duty, presenting the prevention of cruelty as an obligation of Christians and British patriots.

The Association was also involved in religious disagreements within the animal-protection movement. Members of both the SPCA and the Association objected to what they regarded as "Pythagorean principles" in Lewis Gompertz's Moral Inquiries on the Situation of Man and of Brutes. Gompertz, a Jewish vegetarian who was honorary secretary of the SPCA, left that organisation following disputes over his views. In 1832, he and his supporters established the non-sectarian Animals' Friend Society.

== Campaigns ==
The Knacker's Yard, or the Horses' Last Home! by George Cruikshank, published in The Voice of Humanity in 1831

The Association sought to prevent cruelty through legislation, public exposure of abuses and the promotion of humane treatment. Its stated objectives included encouraging petitions to Parliament, distributing practical and religious information, persuading clergy of different denominations to preach on the treatment of animals, and circulating tracts on the subject. It also proposed monitoring conditions at Smithfield Market, the Hackney Coach Office and knackers' yards, and seeking intervention by the police and local authorities in cases of cruelty.

On 9 May 1832, the House of Commons recorded the presentation of a petition from the Association "to prevent Cruelty to Animals".

In April 1833, the Association petitioned the House of Lords about the conditions at London's principal cattle market. The petition, presented by the Bishop of Llandaff, argued that the central location of Smithfield Market required cattle to be driven through crowded streets, causing suffering to the animals and danger to pedestrians. It proposed replacing the existing market with four live-cattle markets, each with an adjoining abattoir, on the outskirts of London.

The Bishop of Llandaff supported the proposal, arguing that relocating the markets would reduce cruelty and remove a public nuisance. The Bishop of Bristol also supported the petition, raising concerns about the condition of cattle slaughtered after being driven through London.

The Association also criticised certain hunting practices. Historian Hilda Kean notes its opposition to keeping captive stags for hunting and breeding stags and foxes specifically to be hunted.

== The Voice of Humanity ==
Title page of The Voice of Humanity, 1830

The Association published The Voice of Humanity: For the Communication and Discussion of All Subjects Relative to the Conduct of Man Towards the Inferior Animal Creation, a quarterly periodical issued in London by J. Nisbet. Three volumes appeared between 1830 and 1833.

The periodical published reports of cruelty and prosecutions, accounts of humane conduct, proposals for reform, sermons and correspondence. Its subjects included slaughterhouses, Smithfield Market, knackers' yards, the treatment of working animals, blood sports and legislation concerning cruelty to animals.

The periodical also provided a means of circulating religious arguments for animal protection. Greenwood's "On National Cruelty", published in its first volume, appealed to Christian teachings and patriotism in condemning cruelty.

Publication ended in 1833 following the Association's financial difficulties. Its 1836 prospectus reviewed the reasons for the suspension and referred to the possibility of reviving the periodical.

== See also ==
- Liverpool Society for Preventing Wanton Cruelty to Brute Animals
- Christianity and animal rights
- Animal welfare in the United Kingdom
