= Predation problem =

Ethical debate over predation

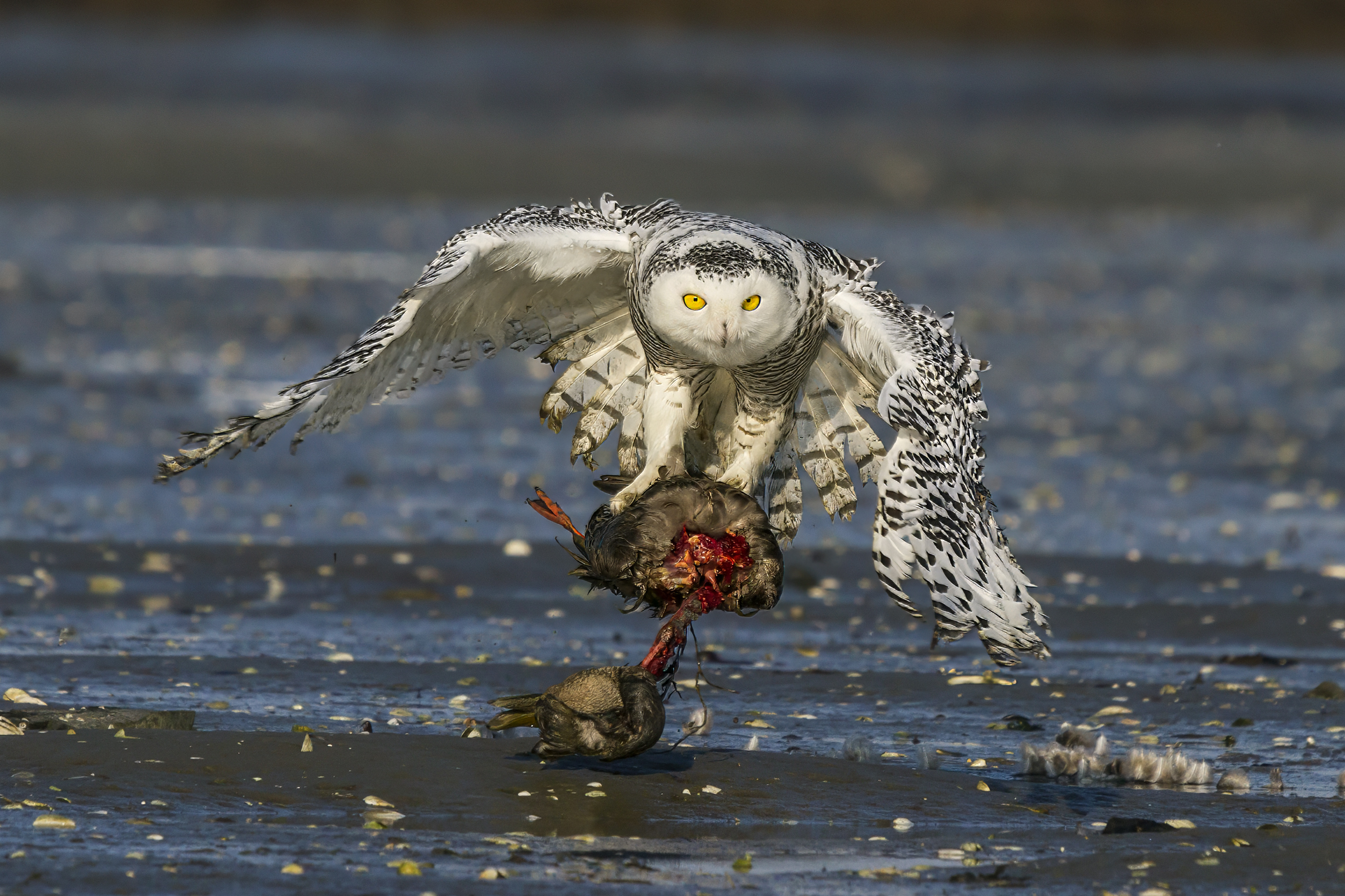
A snowy owl carries a killed American black duck

The predation problem, also known as the predation argument, concerns whether the suffering and death of animals caused by predation constitute a moral problem and whether humans have an obligation to prevent or reduce these harms. It is discussed in animal ethics and environmental ethics, particularly in debates about animal rights and wild animal suffering. Critics argue that recognising animals as rights holders would oblige humans to protect prey from predators, an implication sometimes presented as a reductio ad absurdum against animal rights.

Some philosophers argue that animal rights do not entail an obligation to prevent predation, while others maintain that humans should prevent predation where doing so would reduce suffering without causing greater harm. Other arguments concern whether humans could intervene without disrupting ecosystems or harming the animals they intend to protect.

== Historical views ==
=== Problem of evil ===
Predation has been discussed as a form of natural evil within the problem of evil, particularly in Christian theodicy. One response to natural evil is that humans should alleviate the suffering it causes. Another is that such suffering contributes to goods that would otherwise be absent. Thomas Aquinas defended the latter position, arguing that defects in nature could contribute to the "good of another, or even to the universal good", and that if "all evil were prevented, much good would be absent from the universe".

Some biblical prophecies describe a future in which predators and prey live peacefully together. In the Book of Isaiah, the prophet describes a time when the wolf will live with the lamb and the leopard with the young goat.

In notebooks written between 1487 and 1505, Leonardo da Vinci considered suffering and death in nature, including predation and disease. He suggested that processes that appeared cruel or unjust could nevertheless contribute to the renewal of life. David Hume discussed the suffering of wild animals in Dialogues Concerning Natural Religion (1779), observing that the "stronger prey upon the weaker, and keep them in perpetual terror and anxiety".

In Natural Theology (1802), William Paley described predation as one of the aspects of God's creation whose utility was most difficult to explain. He nevertheless defended it as a means of preventing the excessive increase of animal populations, given that animals produce more offspring than can survive.

Evolutionary theory raised further questions about predation and divine benevolence. Christian accounts that attributed violence in nature to the fall of man faced the difficulty that predation preceded the emergence of humans. Charles Darwin questioned how the suffering caused by parasitic wasps of the family Ichneumonidae, whose larvae feed on living caterpillars, could be reconciled with belief in an omnibenevolent God.

=== Moral judgements about predators ===
The ancient Greek writer Plutarch criticised the characterisation of carnivorous animals such as lions, tigers and snakes as barbarous. He argued that killing other animals was necessary for their survival, whereas humans could obtain food from plants.

The English writer Edward Augustus Kendall questioned whether predatory animals could be held morally responsible for killing. In his collection of moral fables The Canary Bird (1799), Kendall argued that predatory behaviour should not be judged according to human moral standards. He described prejudice against animals for their supposed cruelty as absurd.

=== Philosophical pessimism ===
The Italian poet and philosopher Giacomo Leopardi discussed predation as an example of the suffering inherent in nature. In Operette morali (1827), his "Dialogue between Nature and an Icelander" includes the image of a squirrel fleeing from a rattlesnake only to enter its open mouth. For Leopardi, the episode illustrated how the destruction of living beings accompanies the creation and continuation of life. In Zibaldone, Leopardi also presented predation as evidence of nature's cruelty, a recurring subject in his philosophical pessimism.

Writing in 1851, the German philosopher Arthur Schopenhauer cited the suffering of an animal being devoured by another against the claim that pleasure in the world outweighs pain.

=== Animal rights ===
Lewis Gompertz, an early advocate of animal rights, discussed predation in the fifth chapter of Moral Inquiries on the Situation of Man and of Brutes (1824). In a dialogue, he questioned whether animals killing one another should be judged differently from similar conduct by humans. Gompertz stated that if he witnessed an animal attempting to kill another, he would try to prevent it, although he acknowledged that doing so might be wrong. He also argued that the extinction of carnivorous species would not necessarily be undesirable and suggested that some carnivores, including wolves, might be able to subsist on vegetable food.

The American zoologist and animal rights philosopher J. Howard Moore condemned predation in several books. In Why I Am a Vegetarian (1895), he described carnivorous animals as "relentless brutes" and argued that their behaviour conflicted with principles of ethics, justice and mercy. In Better-World Philosophy (1899), Moore attributed carnivorous behaviour to excessive egoism produced by natural selection and described the violence of nature with the phrase "Life riots on life-tooth and talon, beak and paw". He argued that carnivorous species could not be reconciled with one another in his ideal social arrangement of the universe, which he called a "Confederation of the Consciousnesses". In The New Ethics (1907), he described carnivorous species as "criminal" races, arguing that their survival depended on the destruction of other animals.

In Natural Rights (1903), the Scottish philosopher David G. Ritchie criticised the implications of extending rights to animals. Responding to Henry S. Salt's Animals' Rights (1892), Ritchie argued that recognising animal rights would oblige humans to protect weaker animals from predators. He suggested that this might require killing carnivores or keeping them in captivity on vegetarian diets until they starved. Ritchie presented these consequences as absurd and criticised the declaration of rights for animals as a "hypocritical formula to gratify pug-loving sentimentalists".

== Contemporary views ==
=== Animal ethics ===
Asked by David Rosinger in 1973 whether humans should prevent lions from killing gazelles, the Australian philosopher Peter Singer argued that intervention in wild ecosystems would probably increase animal suffering because of unforeseen ecological consequences. Nevertheless, he maintained that intervention would be justified if it could be reasonably expected to reduce suffering in the long term. He distinguished this position from the claim that predators themselves have moral obligations, which he rejected.

The English philosopher Stephen R. L. Clark examined predation in "The Rights of Wild Things" (1979). Jozef Keulartz identifies this paper as a starting point for the modern debate in animal ethics. Clark disputed David George Ritchie's claim that animal rights necessarily entailed an unacceptable obligation to intervene. He argued that a duty to protect prey might follow in principle without being practicable in ordinary circumstances, and that such a duty was not necessarily absurd.

Tom Regan, in The Case for Animal Rights (1983), argued against a general obligation to prevent predation. His account distinguished between moral agents, who can be held responsible for their actions, and animals that are not moral agents. Regan also treated wild animals as capable of exercising their natural abilities without human supervision. These arguments have been used to defend animal rights without requiring extensive intervention in predator-prey relationships.

Julius Kapembwa maintains that intervention to prevent predation is neither required nor permitted by animal rights theory, using an analysis of the respective rights of prey, predators and potential rescuers.

In "Predation" (1984), Steve Sapontzis rejected the predation problem as a reductio ad absurdum of animal rights. He argued that humans have an obligation to prevent predation when doing so would not cause as much or more suffering than it would prevent. Sapontzis acknowledged practical limits on intervention and maintained that whether humans should prevent predation or address other forms of suffering depends on where their efforts would do the most good.

The economist Tyler Cowen considered predation from consequentialist, rights-based and holistic perspectives in "Policing Nature" (2003). He supported limited interventions that would reduce predation and benefit prey animals, while recognising the risk of ecological disruption. His proposals included reconsidering conservation policies that favour predators.

In "Reprogramming Predators" (2009), the transhumanist philosopher David Pearce proposed using biotechnology to eliminate predation, arguing that a world without suffering could eventually be technologically feasible. His proposals included the use of immunocontraceptives to phase out carnivorous species and genetic modification to produce descendants capable of living on plant-based diets. Pearce also criticised arguments for preserving predation that appeal to the value of natural processes or people's attachment to carnivorous animals.

In "The Meat Eaters", a 2010 essay for The New York Times, the philosopher Jeff McMahan considered the moral problem of predation. He argued that preventing the suffering and death caused by predation would be desirable if this could be achieved without producing greater harms. McMahan suggested that the extinction of carnivorous species might be beneficial under those conditions, but acknowledged the danger of ecological disruption. He responded to objections later that month in "Predators: A Response". McMahan subsequently developed his arguments in "The Moral Problem of Predation", published in Philosophy Comes to Dinner (2015).

Peter Vallentyne considers limited intervention to help prey animals permissible, particularly when the cost to humans is small. He compares such assistance to helping humans in need and does not advocate eliminating predators.

In a 2022 essay, Martha Nussbaum questioned attitudes that treat the suffering of prey as entertainment or regard animals chiefly as food for other animals. Nussbaum acknowledged that large-scale attempts to prevent predation could produce disastrous ecological consequences because of inadequate knowledge. She nevertheless supported considering limited interventions where animals are under human care or management, while arguing that their welfare should be a concern in decisions about wildlife.

Proposals have included opposing the reintroduction of predators to areas from which they have disappeared, and reducing predator populations. The philosopher Ben Bramble has examined whether painlessly killing predators could be morally justified. Such proposals have prompted objections concerning the welfare of predators and the ecological consequences of intervention.

=== Environmental ethics ===
The British ecologist Felicity A. Huntingford examined the ethics of studying predation and aggression in 1984, including experiments in which researchers stage encounters between predators and prey.

In ecology, predation affects population sizes, species interactions and ecosystem structure. Some environmental writers oppose treating predation as a moral wrong. Michael Pollan, for example, has argued that "predation is not a matter of morality or politics; it, also, is a matter of symbiosis". Under Aldo Leopold's land ethic, the conservation of native predators is justified by their place within ecological communities.

The environmental philosopher J. Baird Callicott argues that extending animal rights principles to predator-prey relationships could require protecting prey from predators, with consequences for the ecological communities and species that animal advocates seek to protect. He points to the role of predators in regulating prey populations.

Holmes Rolston III regards predation as an integral part of ecological processes and evolution, describing it as a "sad good" that should be respected despite the suffering it causes. Ty Raterman similarly argues that predation can be regarded as regrettable without accepting an obligation to prevent it.

The environmental ethicist William Lynn has argued that predation contributes to the welfare of both predators and prey populations and to the integrity of ecological communities. Christian environmental ethicist Larry Rasmussen has likewise questioned whether predation should be treated as a model for human conduct, stating that it is "not a pattern of morality we praise and advocate".

== Other uses of the term ==
In wildlife management, the term "predation problem" also refers to conflicts involving predators that kill animals valued by humans for economic, recreational or conservation reasons. Examples include domestic sheep predation by coyotes, farmed salmon predation by seals, predation on animals hunted for sport or food, and cat predation of wild animals. Wildlife management responses may include culling or removing predators to reduce such losses.

== See also ==
- Animal ethics
- Relationship between animal ethics and environmental ethics
- Ecology of fear
- Sentience
- Wild animal suffering
