= Jessica Pierce =

American bioethicist, philosopher and writer

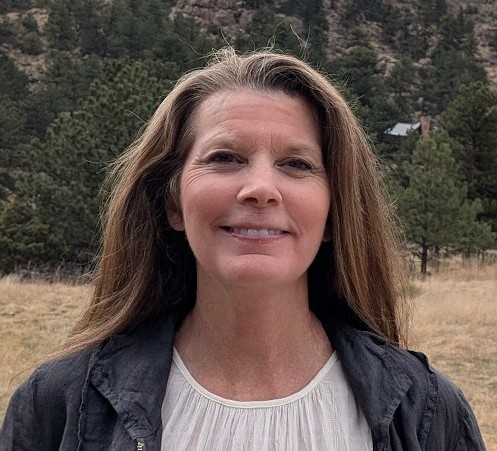
- Born: October 21, 1965 (age 60)

Education
- Education: University of Virginia

Philosophical work
- Main interests: Bioethics, environmental studies, animal studies, animal ethics, environmental ethics
- Website: jessicapierce.net

Jessica Pierce (born October 21, 1965) is an American bioethicist, philosopher, and writer. Early in her career, her research primarily addressed ethical questions about healthcare and the environment. Since the 2000s, however, much of her work has focused on animal ethics, including questions about the ethics of pet-keeping; dog-human relationships; and morality in animals. She is the author of numerous books on human–animal relationships, including Wild Justice (with Marc Bekoff), The Last Walk, Run, Spot, Run, Unleashing Your Dog (with Bekoff), A Dog’s World (with Bekoff), and Who’s a Good Dog?

== Career ==
Pierce completed her Bachelor of Arts at Scripps College, before studying for a Master of Theological Studies at Divinity School of Harvard University. She then received a PhD in religious studies (specialising in religious ethics) at the University of Virginia. In the late 1980s, Pierce became a "major advocate" of environmental sustainability in healthcare, epitomising (in the words of the philosopher Cristina Richie) a "'second generation' of environmental bioethicists", after a first generation epitomised by Van Rensselaer Potter.

In 1993, Pierce briefly worked as an assistant professor in the Randolph-Macon Women's College Department of Religion. From 1993 to 2000, she was an assistant professor at the University of Nebraska Medical Center in the Humanities and Law section of the Department of Preventive and Societal Medicine. Her first book, Environmentalism and the New Logic of Business, co-written with R. Edward Freeman and Richard H. Dodd, was published in 2000.

Pierce was a visiting fellow at the University of Pittsburgh Center for Bioethics and Health Law from 1999 to 2000, and then, from 2001 to 2006, she lectured at the University of Colorado Boulder, working in departments focused respectively on philosophy, religious studies and environmental studies. The Ethics of Environmentally Responsible Health Care, which Pierce cowrote with Andrew Jameton, was published in 2004, and Pierce's case book Morality Play followed in 2005.

After leaving Boulder in 2006, Pierce became affiliated with the Center for Bioethics and Humanities at the University of Colorado Denver (later the Anschutz Medical Campus). However, this connection is a loose one; she no longer teaches, and considers herself an "independent entity", focusing on writing instead of the administration and bureaucracy of university work. She published Contemporary Bioethics, a reader co-edited with George Randals, in 2009.

Having previously focused her research on human health, including her early research interests in the connections between health and the environment, Pierce began to focus her research on animals in the 2000s. She co-authored Wild Justice with the ecologist and ethologist Marc Bekoff in 2010, and two sole-authored books followed: The Last Walk in 2012 and Run, Spot, Run in 2016. She subsequently collaborated with Bekoff on 2007's The Animals' Agenda, which was published the same year as Pierce's second collection, Hospice and Palliative Care for Companion Animals, co-edited with Amir Shanan and Tamara Shearer. Again writing with Bekoff, she published Unleashing Your Dog in 2019 and A Dog's World in 2021. Her sole-authored monograph Who's a Good Dog? followed in 2023, her Dogpedia: A Brief Compendium of Canine Curiosities was published in 2024, and her Who's a Good Human? was published in 2026.

== Research and philosophical works ==
Pierce's early scholarship concerned environmental bioethics, an interdisciplinary area examining the ethical relationship between healthcare systems and ecological sustainability. In Environmentalism and the New Logic of Business, Freeman, Dodd, and Pierce argue that businesses should lead on environmental issues rather than merely meeting state-mandated standards. In The Ethics of Environmentally Responsible Health Care, Pierce and Jameton analyze the environmental consequences of medical institutions and argues for integrating ecological responsibility into healthcare ethics and clinical decision-making.

Pierce's research has contributed to philosophical and scientific discussions concerning the evolutionary origins of morality. In Wild Justice, she and Bekoff argue that social animals display forms of empathy, fairness, cooperation, and conflict resolution that constitute precursors to moral behavior. In The Animals' Agenda, Pierce's second book with Bekoff, the authors argue that the science of animal welfare should be replaced by a science of animal well-being.

In Run, Spot, Run, Pierce explores the moral complexities of human–companion animal relationships. She emphasizes that modern pet keeping often constrains animals’ autonomy and species-specific behaviors, raising ethical questions about confinement, training, and domestication practices. Pierce has also written on aging, illness, and death in companion animals. Her book The Last Walk combines philosophical reflection with practical ethical guidance, addressing the emotional and moral complexities surrounding end-of-life decisions for pets. The work examines euthanasia, caregiving responsibilities, and grief, emphasizing compassionate and ethically informed decision-making.

Pierce's later writings focus on canine cognition, welfare, and ethical coexistence. In Unleashing Your Dog, A Dog's World, and Who's a Good Dog?, she advocates for an understanding of dogs' sensory experiences, social needs, and agency.

== Public writing ==
Pierce's popular writing includes work for The New York Times, Scientific American, The Washington Post, Time Magazine, Aeon, and New Scientist. Her essays have appeared in The New York Times, where she has written on pet enrichment, loneliness, and ethical issues surrounding cloning.

== Selected bibliography ==
In addition to her books, Pierce has authored or co-authored over 50 articles in peer reviewed journals and chapters in scholarly edited collections.

- Freeman, R. Edward, Jessica Pierce and Richard H. Dodd (2000). Environmentalism and the New Logic of Business: How Firms Can be Profitable and Leave Our Children a Living Planet. Oxford: Oxford University Press.
- Pierce, Jessica, and Andrew Jameton (2004). The Ethics of Environmentally Responsible Health Care. Oxford: Oxford University Press.
- Pierce, Jessica (2005). Morality Play: Case Studies in Ethics. New York: McGraw-Hill.
  - Second edition published by Waveland Press in 2013.
- Pierce, Jessica and George Randels, eds. (2009). Contemporary Bioethics: A Reader with Cases. Oxford: Oxford University Press.
- Bekoff, Marc, and Jessica Pierce (2010). Wild Justice: The Moral Lives of Animals. Chicago: University of Chicago Press.
- Pierce, Jessica (2012). The Last Walk: Reflections on Our Pets at the End of Their Lives. Chicago: University of Chicago Press.
- Pierce, Jessica (2016). Run, Spot, Run: The Ethics of Keeping Pets. Chicago: University of Chicago Press.
- Bekoff, Marc, and Jessica Pierce (2017). The Animals' Agenda: Freedom, Compassion, and Coexistence in the Human Age. Boston: Beacon Press.
- Shanan, Amir, Tamara Shearer, and Jessica Pierce, eds. (2017). Hospice and Palliative Care for Companion Animals: Principles and Practice. Hoboken: Wiley.
- Bekoff, Marc, and Jessica Pierce (2019). Unleashing Your Dog: A Field Guide to Giving Your Canine Companion the Best Life Possible. Novato, California: New World Library.
- Pierce, Jessica, and Marc Bekoff (2021). A Dog's World: Imagining the Lives of Dogs in a World without Humans. Princeton: Princeton University Press.
- Pierce, Jessica (2023). Who's a Good Dog? And How to Be a Better Human. Chicago: University of Chicago Press.
- Pierce, Jessica (2024). Dogpedia: A Brief Compendium of Canine Curiosities. Princeton, NJ:: Princeton University Press.
- Pierce, Jessica (2026). Who's a Good Human?: Practical Exercises for Living Mindfully with DogsChicago: University of Chicago Press.
