= Liverpool Society for Preventing Wanton Cruelty to Brute Animals =

Defunct British animal welfare organisation

- Founding resolutions of the Society, 1809
- Formation: 25 October 1809; 216 years ago
- Founded at: Liverpool, England
- Type: Animal welfare organisation

The Liverpool Society for Preventing Wanton Cruelty to Brute Animals was a British animal welfare organisation founded in Liverpool on 25 October 1809. Historians Alun Howkins and Linda Merricks describe it as the first animal-protection movement, while historian Chien-hui Li identifies it as the earliest traceable society of its kind.

The Society proposed preventing cruelty through enforcement of existing laws, investigation and public exposure of abuses, withdrawal of trade from people who mistreated animals, and education. Its principal concerns included the overloading of working horses and the treatment of animals by carters and butchers. The organisation appears to have been short-lived.

== History ==
In 1809, Lord Erskine introduced a bill in Parliament to prevent malicious and wanton cruelty to animals. The bill passed the House of Lords but was defeated in the House of Commons. The Liverpool Society was founded later that year, on 25 October.

According to its published account, the Society originated at a meeting held on 25 October 1809, the day of a public jubilee celebrating the reign of George III. The participants agreed to date the organisation's establishment from that meeting. Its founding resolutions described animals as part of "sentient creation" dependent on human protection and identified the overloading and mistreatment of cart horses and other draught animals as a particular problem in Liverpool.

The modern RSPCA Liverpool Branch identifies the meeting place as the Crown and Anchor Coffee House in Bold Street, Liverpool, where the participants assembled at 7 pm.

A committee appointed at the founding meeting was re-elected at a general meeting on 7 November and instructed to prepare a statement of the Society's objectives and proposed methods. The committee presented its report at a public meeting on 28 November, when a new committee was appointed. The report was subsequently printed and circulated in Liverpool.

The report was published as Report of the Society for Preventing Wanton Cruelty to Brute Animals: Instituted at Liverpool, October 25, 1809. The following year, Samuel Jackson Pratt reproduced a substantial account of the Society's proposals in the notes to his poem The Lower World.

According to the RSPCA Liverpool Branch's history, reports of the Society's activities appeared in Billinge's Liverpool Advertiser and Marine Intelligence. The branch states that some hauliers and carters opposed the Society because they feared being prevented from using sick or infirm animals. Members were reportedly confronted after meetings, eventually prompting the Society to meet in secret.

Li writes that the Society "did not seem to have lasted long". The modern RSPCA Liverpool Branch traces its origins to the 1809 organisation and states that the Liverpool group joined the RSPCA in 1841.

== Aims and methods ==
A cart being driven by horses in Liverpool, depicted in The Picture of Liverpool (1808), the year before the Society was founded

The Society stated that its object was "to meliorate the state of brute animals, by preventing those sufferings which they unnecessarily experience at the hand of man". Its committee proposed pursuing this objective through two approaches: coercion of people responsible for cruelty and the promotion of attitudes opposed to cruelty.

The committee identified three forms of coercion: enforcement of the law, public shame and what it called "individual discountenance". It considered existing legislation sufficient to address the overloading of carters' horses, provided that the law was enforced. The committee also proposed seeking legal advice to determine which other forms of cruelty could be prosecuted under existing laws.

To expose cruelty, the Society proposed appointing a committee to investigate reported incidents and publish accounts of substantiated cases in newspapers. It recommended identifying offenders by name only in particularly serious cases and, where practicable, informing those concerned before publishing an account. Members were also encouraged to withdraw their custom from tradespeople who mistreated animals and explain their reasons for doing so.

The report identified cruelty by carters and butchers as requiring particular attention in Liverpool. It described abuses involving animals driven into or through the town, including an incident in which a sheep had been seen with one of its horns torn from the socket. The committee also reported the practice of cutting sheep's heel tendons to make the animals easier to drive through the streets. It recommended withholding trade from people who committed or authorised such acts. Historian Hannah Velten has described the Society as targeting brutality by cattle drovers.

The Society also proposed educational measures. Its committee recommended publishing inexpensive books to encourage kindness towards animals, particularly among children. It suggested that prizes could eventually be offered for essays on animal treatment, giving "the best mode of securing honey without destroying the bees" as an example of a possible subject.

The committee argued that criticism of cruelty should extend to people of every social rank, rather than being directed only at poorer people. It also opposed obtaining evidence through deception and urged members to examine their own households for practices that caused animals to suffer for amusement or luxury.

The report concluded with five proposals for immediate action. These were weekly inspections of Liverpool's docks and other commercial districts to identify the overloading of horses; distribution of the town's bylaws concerning carters; legal advice on the application of existing laws to animal cruelty; appointment of a committee to investigate and publicise cruelty cases; and appointment of another committee to prepare or select publications encouraging kindness towards animals.

== See also ==
- Association for Promoting Rational Humanity towards the Animal Creation
- Animals' Friend Society
- History of animal rights
- History of Liverpool
