= Morals, Reason, and Animals =

1987 book by Steve F. Sapontzis

- First edition cover
- Author: Steve F. Sapontzis
- Language: English
- Subjects: Animal ethics; animal rights
- Genre: Philosophy
- Publisher: Temple University Press
- Publication date: 1987
- Publication place: United States
- Media type: Print (hardcover)
- Pages: xix + 302
- ISBN: 978-0-87722-493-8
- OCLC: 802995461
- Text: Morals, Reason, and Animals at the Internet Archive

Morals, Reason, and Animals is a 1987 book by the American philosopher Steve F. Sapontzis, published by Temple University Press. The book examines arguments about the moral status of non-human animals and criticizes the view that rationality is necessary for moral consideration. Sapontzis argues that animals should be included in the moral community because they are sentient and capable of suffering.

Sapontzis described the book as a "second-generation contribution" to animal liberation philosophy. It engages with earlier work by Peter Singer and Tom Regan, and discusses topics including vegetarianism, animal experimentation, wild animal suffering, and the relationship between animal ethics and environmental ethics. Reviewers gave mixed assessments, praising aspects of its clarity and applied discussions while criticizing parts of its theoretical argument.

== Background ==
Morals, Reason, and Animals was the first book by Steve F. Sapontzis. At the time, Sapontzis was professor of philosophy at California State University Hayward, later California State University, East Bay, where he taught from 1971 until 1999.

The book developed from articles written between 1979 and 1985. In the preface, Sapontzis characterized it as a "second-generation contribution" to animal liberation philosophy, intended to address questions and criticisms arising from earlier work by writers such as Peter Singer and Tom Regan. Sapontzis presented the book as part of an ongoing discussion rather than a final statement of the subject.

== Summary ==
The book is divided into four parts. The first part questions the use of reason as the basis for morality and argues that moral respect should not be limited to rational beings. Sapontzis criticizes the claim that only rational agents can be moral or can merit moral consideration, and argues that animals can exhibit virtuous behavior even if they are not full moral agents.

The second part discusses the meaning and implications of animal liberation. Sapontzis defends the use of rights, equality, and liberation language in relation to non-human animals. He gives three reasons for animal liberation: the cultivation of moral character, the promotion of happiness, and fairness.

The third part addresses objections to animal rights, including questions about whether animals can have interests, whether they belong to a moral community, and whether death is a misfortune for them. Sapontzis argues that non-human animals have morally relevant interests and that these interests justify their inclusion in the moral community. He maintains that the burden of proof should lie with those who deny animals equal moral consideration.

The book also discusses practical implications of animal liberation, including vegetarianism, animal experimentation, and the predation problem. (Note: See also Sapontzis's 1984 paper, "Predation".) Sapontzis argues that helping wild animals should not be dismissed as absurd, provided that such interventions do not cause greater harm. The final chapters compare environmental ethics and animal ethics, discussing tensions between holistic ecological views and approaches focused on individual moral concern.

== Reception ==
In Philosophy in Review, Frank De Roose gave the book a mixed assessment. He wrote that it contained many interesting discussions and that its later chapters, especially those on applied ethics, were original and persuasive. He criticized the book for what he saw as a lack of theoretical coherence and philosophical rigor, arguing that Sapontzis relied heavily on existing views, especially those of Singer and Regan, without sufficiently developing a new framework. De Roose was skeptical of Sapontzis's use of fairness as a basis for animal rights and found the treatment of rationality inconsistent across chapters. He described Sapontzis's writing as clear and committed to common-sense morality, but concluded that the book was "a step backward rather than a step forward" in animal ethics.

In the Denver Journal of International Law & Policy, Sudhir K. Chopra described the book as a timely and comprehensive contribution to literature on animal rights and environmental ethics. He wrote that the book was relevant to legal theorists and environmental lawyers, and that it drew on philosophical traditions often overlooked in legal discussions. Chopra praised Sapontzis for addressing major objections to animal rights and for connecting environmental ethics with animal liberation. He characterized it as a "second generation" study that avoided some limitations of earlier animal rights literature through its clarity, structure, and use of examples.

In Between the Species, the philosopher Jamie Lindemann Nelson described the book as an original and serious contribution to animal ethics. She discussed Sapontzis's "anti-theoretical" approach, which emphasizes practical moral reasoning over abstract theorizing. Nelson considered Sapontzis's critique of rationality as a basis for moral standing to be strong, especially his argument that animals can have agent-dependent moral value. She also discussed the book's pluralistic ethical framework and its attempt to show how virtue, happiness, and fairness support animal liberation. While noting unresolved questions, including the implications of benefiting from past animal research, Nelson concluded that the book advanced discussion of the moral status of non-human animals.

In the Journal of Medical Ethics, Jane A. Smith described the book as a thoughtful and accessible "second-generation contribution" to the philosophical debate on animal rights. She discussed Sapontzis's argument that morality is not exclusive to rational beings, and his use of everyday morality to challenge the exclusion of animals from moral consideration. Smith found Sapontzis's discussion of moral character, suffering, and fairness persuasive. She noted that some claims, such as those concerning animal virtue, were illustrated largely through anecdotes, but concluded that the book offered a useful framework for thinking about moral obligations toward animals.

== Later discussion ==
Morals, Reason, and Animals has been discussed by the organization Animal Ethics for its treatment of wild animal suffering and its criticism of rationality as the basis for moral consideration. The organization notes that Sapontzis argued for sentience, rather than intelligence, as the basis of moral status, and defended the permissibility of helping wild animals when doing so would not cause greater harm.

== Publication history ==
Morals, Reason, and Animals was first published in hardcover in 1987 by Temple University Press in Philadelphia. A second edition was published in 1992.

== See also ==
- Moral circle expansion
- Predation problem
- Relationship between animal ethics and environmental ethics
- Sentientism
