= Marc Bekoff =

American biologist (born 1945)

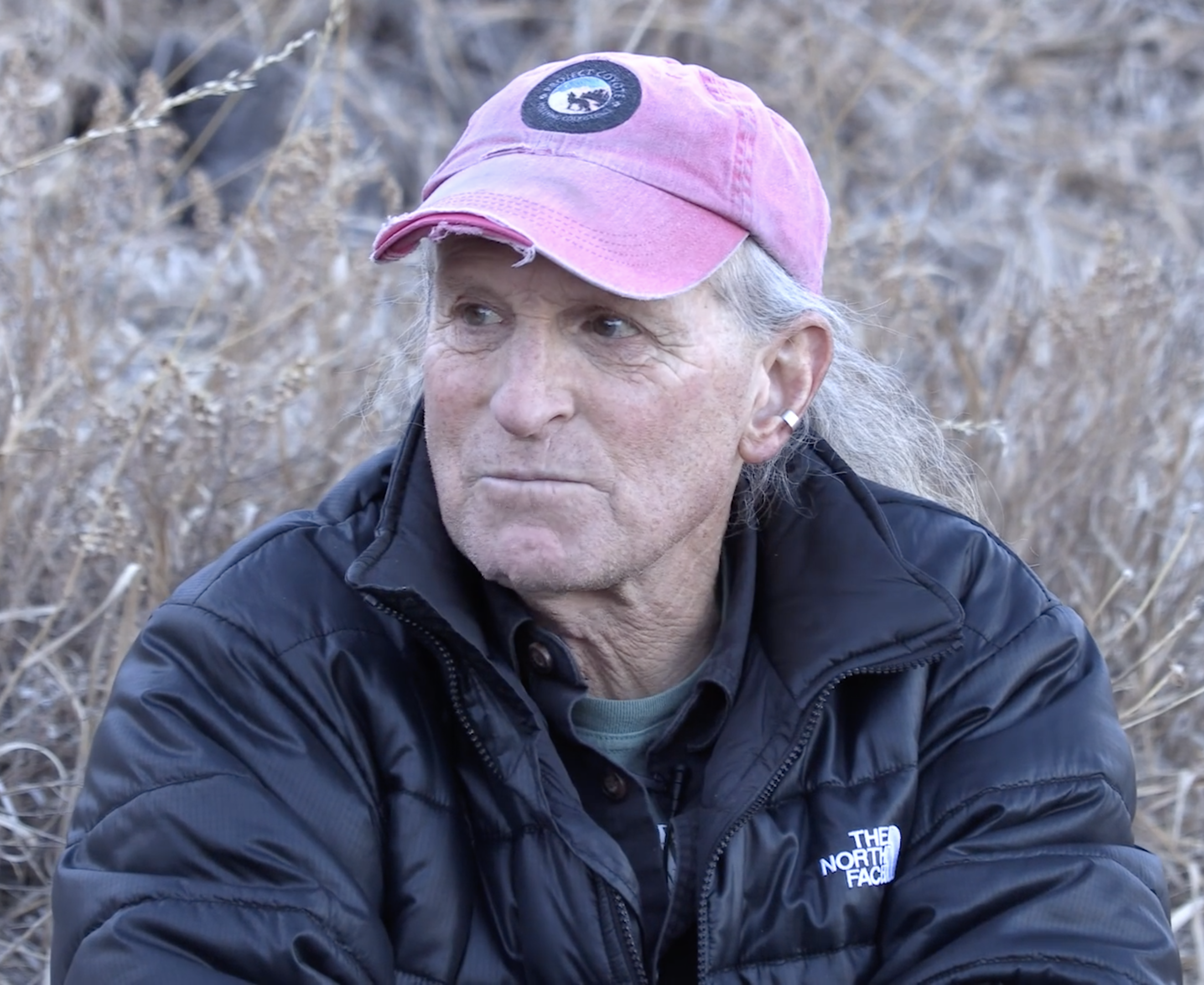
- Bekoff in 2018
- Born: September 6, 1945 (age 81); Brooklyn, New York, U.S.
- Education: AB (1967), Washington University; MA (1968), Hofstra University; PhD (1972, animal behavior), Washington University
- Occupations: Scientist, educator, writer
- Website: marcbekoff.com

Marc Bekoff (born September 6, 1945, in Brooklyn, New York) is an American biologist, ethologist, behavioral ecologist and writer. He is professor emeritus of Ecology and Evolutionary Biology at the University of Colorado Boulder and cofounder of the Jane Goodall Institute of Ethologists for the Ethical Treatment of Animals, and cofounder of the Jane Goodall Roots & Shoots program.

== Education and academic career ==
Bekoff earned a Bachelor of Arts degree from Washington University in St. Louis in 1967, a Master of Arts from Hofstra University in 1968, and a Ph.D. in Animal Behavior from Washington University in 1972. After completing his Ph.D., he became an assistant professor of biology at University of Missouri–St. Louis in 1973 through 1974. He went on to work at the University of Colorado Boulder as a professor of organismic biology where he pursued research into ethology, animal behavior, behavioral ecology, development and evolution of behavior. Bekoff retired from his active professorship after 32 years and currently holds the position of professor emeritus of Ecology and Evolutionary Biology at the University of Colorado Boulder.

== Writing and activism ==
Bekoff has been described as an activist who embodies non-aggressive means. He promotes the idea that responsible assertiveness is invariably superior to aggression. He lectures internationally on animal behavior, cognitive ethology, and behavioral ecology, and writes a science column on animal emotion for Psychology Today.

Bekoff is an advocate for the compassionate conservation movement. In 2000, Bekoff and Goodall announced the formation of Ethologists for the Ethical Treatment of Animals (EETA) to develop and maintain the highest ethical standards in ethological research with a focus on Cognitive ethology and animal sentience. Bekoff is a patron of the Captive Animals Protection Society, the Global Animal Law Association, and serves on the Science Advisory Board of Project Coyote, a national non-profit organization promoting compassionate conservation and coexistence between people and wildlife through education, science, and advocacy.

In addition to his advocacy for animals, Bekoff has also worked extensively with inmates at Boulder County Jail, teaching courses on science, compassion and ethics.

Bekoff has written, co-authored, and edited extensively for both academic and general audiences. His writing has found resonance outside academia in publications including, The New York Times, National Geographic, and Live Science. Bekoff argues that non-human animals demonstrate emotional and moral intelligence. He has written about the grieving rituals of several different species and has recently written articles expressing his belief that non-human animals have spiritual experiences.

Bekoff is a vegan. In May 2010, he argued in an article for the Greater Good Science Center, "Expanding Our Compassionate Footprint," that human beings need to abandon human exceptionalism: "Research on animal morality is blossoming, and if we can break free of theoretical prejudices, we may come to better understand ourselves and the other animals with whom we share this planet."

== Selected awards ==
- The Exemplar Award (2000) from the Animal Behavior Society
- Animal Behavior Society Fellowship (1995)
- Guggenheim Fellowship (1980)
- The Bank One Faculty Community Service Award (2005)
- St. Francis of Assisi Award by the New Zealand SPCA (2009)
- Honorary member, Animalisti Italiani
- Honorary member, Fundacion Altarriba
- Honorary board member, Rational Animal

== Selected bibliography ==
=== Author ===
- Bekoff, Marc (21 December 1995). Jamieson, Dale (ed.). Readings in Animal Cognition. A Bradford Book. ISBN 978-0262522083.
- Carrier, Jim; Bekoff, Marc (21 March 1996). Nature's Life Lessons: Everyday Truths from Nature. Fulcrum Publishing. ISBN 978-1555912482.
- Allen, Colin; Bekoff, Marc (3 April 1998). Nature's Purposes: Analyses of Function and Design in Biology. The MIT Press. ISBN 978-0262510974.
- Bekoff, Marc (4 June 1998). Byers, John A. (ed.). Animal Play: Evolutionary, Comparative and Ecological Perspectives. Cambridge University Press. ISBN 978-0521586566.
- Allen, Colin; Bekoff, Marc (26 July 1999). Species of Mind: The Philosophy and Biology of Cognitive Ethology. MIT Press. ISBN 978-0262511087.
- Bekoff, Marc (1 June 2000). Strolling with Our Kin: Speaking for and Respecting Voiceless Animals. American Anti-Vivisection Society. ISBN 978-1881699026.
- Bekoff, Marc; Gould, Stephen Jay (10 October 2000). The Smile of a Dolphin: Remarkable Accounts of Animal Emotions. Discovery Books. ISBN 978-1563319259.
- Bekoff, Marc (15 December 2001). Coyotes: Biology, Behavior and Management. The Blackburn Press. ISBN 978-1930665422.
- Bekoff, Marc (1 January 2002). Minding Animals: Awareness, Emotions, and Heart. Oxford University Press USA. ISBN 978-0195163377.
- Bekoff, Marc; Allen, Colin; Burghardt, Gordon (15 June 2002). The Cognitive Animal: Empirical and Theoretical Perspectives on Animal Cognition. Bradford Books. ISBN 978-0262523226.
- Goodall, Jane; Bekoff, Marc (21 October 2003). The Ten Trusts: What We Must Do to Care for The Animals We Love. HarperOne. ISBN 978-0060556112.
- Bekoff, Marc; Goodall, Jane (28 December 2005). Animal Passions and Beastly Virtues: Reflections on Redecorating Nature (Animals Culture And Society). Temple University Press. ISBN 978-1592133482.
- Bekoff, Marc; Goodall, Jane (13 November 2007). Animals Matter: A Biologist Explains Why We Should Treat Animals with Compassion and Respect. Shambhala. ISBN 978-1590305225.
- Bekoff, Mark; Goodall, Jane (28 May 2008). The Emotional Lives of Animals: A Leading Scientist Explores Animal Joy, Sorrow, and Empathy ― and Why They Matter. New World Library. ISBN 978-1577316299..
- Bekoff, Marc (28 September 2008). Animals at Play: Rules of the Game. Temple University Press. ISBN 978-1592135516.
- Bekoff, Marc; Lowe, Cara Blessley, eds. (30 November 2008). Listening to Cougar. University Press of Colorado. ISBN 978-0870819360.
- Bekoff, Marc (9 February 2010). The Animal Manifesto: Six Reasons for Expanding Our Compassion Footprint. New World Library. ISBN 978-1577316497.
- Bekoff, Marc; Pierce, Jennifer (1 May 2010). Wild Justice: The Moral Lives of Animals. University of Chicago Press. ISBN 978-0226041636.
- Robinson, Jill; Bekoff, Marc (1 March 2013). Jasper's Story: Saving Moon Bears. Sleeping Bear Press. ISBN 978-1585367986.
- Bekoff, Marc (1 June 2013). Ignoring Nature No More: The Case for Compassionate Conservation. University of Chicago Press. ISBN 978-0226925356.
- Bekoff, Marc (5 November 2013). Why Dogs Hump and Bees Get Depressed: The Fascinating Science of Animal Intelligence, Emotions, Friendship, and Conservation. New World Library. ISBN 978-1608682195.
- Bekoff, Marc (28 October 2014). Rewilding Our Hearts: Building Pathways of Compassion and Coexistence. New World Library. ISBN 978-1577319542.
- Bekoff, Mark; Pierce, Jessica (18 April 2017). The Animals' Agenda: Freedom, Compassion, and Coexistence in the Human Age. Beacon Press. ISBN 978-0807045206.
- Bekoff, Marc (13 April 2018). Canine Confidential: Why Dogs Do What They Do. University of Chicago Press. ISBN 978-0226433035.
- Bekoff, Marc; Pierce, Jessica (5 March 2019). Unleashing Your Dog: A Field Guide to Giving Your Canine Companion the Best Life Possible. New World Library. ISBN 978-1608685424.
- Edwards, Andres R; Bekoff, Marc (2 April 2019). Renewal: How Nature Awakens Our Creativity, Compassion, and Joy. New Society Publishers. ISBN 978-0865718807.
- McIntyre, Rick; Bekoff, Marc (29 September 2020). The Reign of Wolf 21: The Saga of Yellowstone's Legendary Druid Pack (The Alpha Wolves of Yellowstone, 2). Greystone Books. ISBN 978-1771645249.
- Bekoff, Marc (October 2020). Canine Confidential Lib/E: Why Dogs Do What They Do. The University of Chicago Press. ISBN 978-0226755694.
- Pierce, Jessica; Bekoff, Marc (5 October 2021). A Dog's World: Imagining the Lives of Dogs in a World without Humans. Princeton University Press. ISBN 978-0691196183.

=== Editor ===
- Burghardt, Gordon M.; Bekoff, Marc, eds. (1 January 1978). The Development of behavior: Comparative and evolutionary aspects (Garland series in ethology). Garland STPM Press. ISBN 978-0824070151.
- Bekoff, Marc, ed. (30 September 2007). Encyclopedia of Human-Animal Relationships [4 volumes]: A Global Exploration of Our Connections with Animals. Greenwood; Illustrated edition. ISBN 978-0313334870.
- Kemmerer, Lisa (31 May 2012). Bekoff, Marc (ed.). Primate People: Saving Nonhuman Primates through Education, Advocacy, and Sanctuary. University of Utah Press. ISBN 978-1607811534.
