= Charles Magel =

American philosopher and animal rights activist (1920–2014)

- Born: Charles Russell Magel; June 3, 1920; Burlington, Iowa, U.S.
- Died: March 22, 2014 (aged 93)
- Resting place: Fort Snelling National Cemetery
- Occupations: Philosopher; animal rights activist; bibliographer

Education
- Education: Iowa State College; Northwestern University; University of Minnesota
- Thesis: An Analysis of Kierkegaard's Philosophic Categories

Philosophical work
- Era: Contemporary philosophy
- Institutions: Moorhead State University
- Main interests: Animal ethics; applied ethics

Charles Russell Magel (June 3, 1920 – March 22, 2014) was an American philosopher, animal rights activist and bibliographer. He was professor emeritus of Philosophy and Ethics at Moorhead State University.

== Early life ==
Magel was born on June 3, 1920 in Burlington, Iowa, where he grew up on a 150-acre farm with eight siblings. He studied electrical engineering at Iowa State College, going on to study at Northwestern University for three years.

After graduation, he worked as a night clerk at a hotel and served for five years in the US Naval Reserve during the Second World War. In 1950, inspired by Albert Schweitzer's autobiography Out of My Life and Thought, Magel enrolled in graduate school at the University of Minnesota to study philosophy.

Magel submitted his dissertation, An Analysis of Kierkegaard's Philosophic Categories in 1960. In 1962, he initiated a philosophy program at Moorhead State University.

== Career ==
After reading Peter Singer's Animal Liberation and Tom Regan's "The Moral Basis of Vegetarianism", in 1975, Magel became a vegetarian and introduced an animal rights course onto the philosophy curriculum, making it one of the first university courses completely focused on the topic. He was considered to be a pioneer of applied ethics.

Magel was an outspoken opponent of animal testing, once stating:

Ask the experimenters why they experiment on animals, and the answer is: 'Because the animals are like us.' Ask the experimenters why it is morally okay to experiment on animals, and the answer is: 'Because the animals are not like us.' Animal experimentation rests on a logical contradiction.

In the 1980 edition of Henry S. Salt's Animals' Rights Considered in Relation to Social Progress, edited by Peter Singer, Magel updated Salt's original bibliography. In 1981, Magel published A Bibliography on Animal Rights and Related Matters, which lists over 3,200 works. He retired from teaching in 1985.

In 1989, Magel authored Keyguide to Information Sources in Animal Rights a bibliography of works dealing with animal rights. It was positively reviewed as an "outstanding resource that many academic libraries will want to acquire." Another review described it as a "carefully crafted and scholarly overview to the literature and philosophy of the animal rights movement."

Magel published a new edition of J. Howard Moore's The Universal Kinship in 1992, which included a biographical essay of Moore, and in 1997, he released a new edition of Lewis Gompertz's Moral Inquiries on the Situation of Man and of Brutes.

== Death ==
Magel died on March 22, 2014, aged 93. He was buried at Fort Snelling National Cemetery.

Magle left Moorhead State University $800,000 to establish the Charles R. Magel Endowment Fund.

== Selected publications ==
=== Articles ===
- Magel, Charles R. (1980). "The Moral Status of Animals". Environmental Ethics (Book Review). 2 (2): 179–185. Bibcode:1980EnEth...2..179M. doi:10.5840/enviroethics19802235.
- Magel, Charles (1985). "Animals: Moral Rights and Legal Rights". Between the Species. 1 (2). doi:10.15368/bts.1985v1n2.2.
- Magel, Charles (1988). "Journey From Iowa Farm Boy to Animal Rights Bibliographer". Between the Species. 4 (4). doi:10.15368/bts.1988v4n4.14.
- Magel, Charles (1990). "Animal Liberators Are Not Anti-Science". Between the Species. 6 (4). doi:10.15368/bts.1990v6n4.12.

=== Books ===
- A Bibliography on Animal Rights and Related Matters. Lanham, Maryland: University Press of America. 1981. ISBN 978-0819114884.
- Keyguide to Information Sources in Animal Rights. London: Mansell. 1989. ISBN 978-0720119848.
- Moore, J. Howard (1992). Magel, Charles (ed.). The Universal Kinship. Fontwell: Centaur Press. ISBN 978-0900001345.
- Gompertz, Lewis (1997). Magel, Charles (ed.). Moral Inquiries on the Situation of Man and of Brutes. Lewiston, New York: Edwin Mellen Press. ISBN 978-0773487222.

== See also ==
- List of animal rights advocates
