= Lisa Kemmerer =

American academic

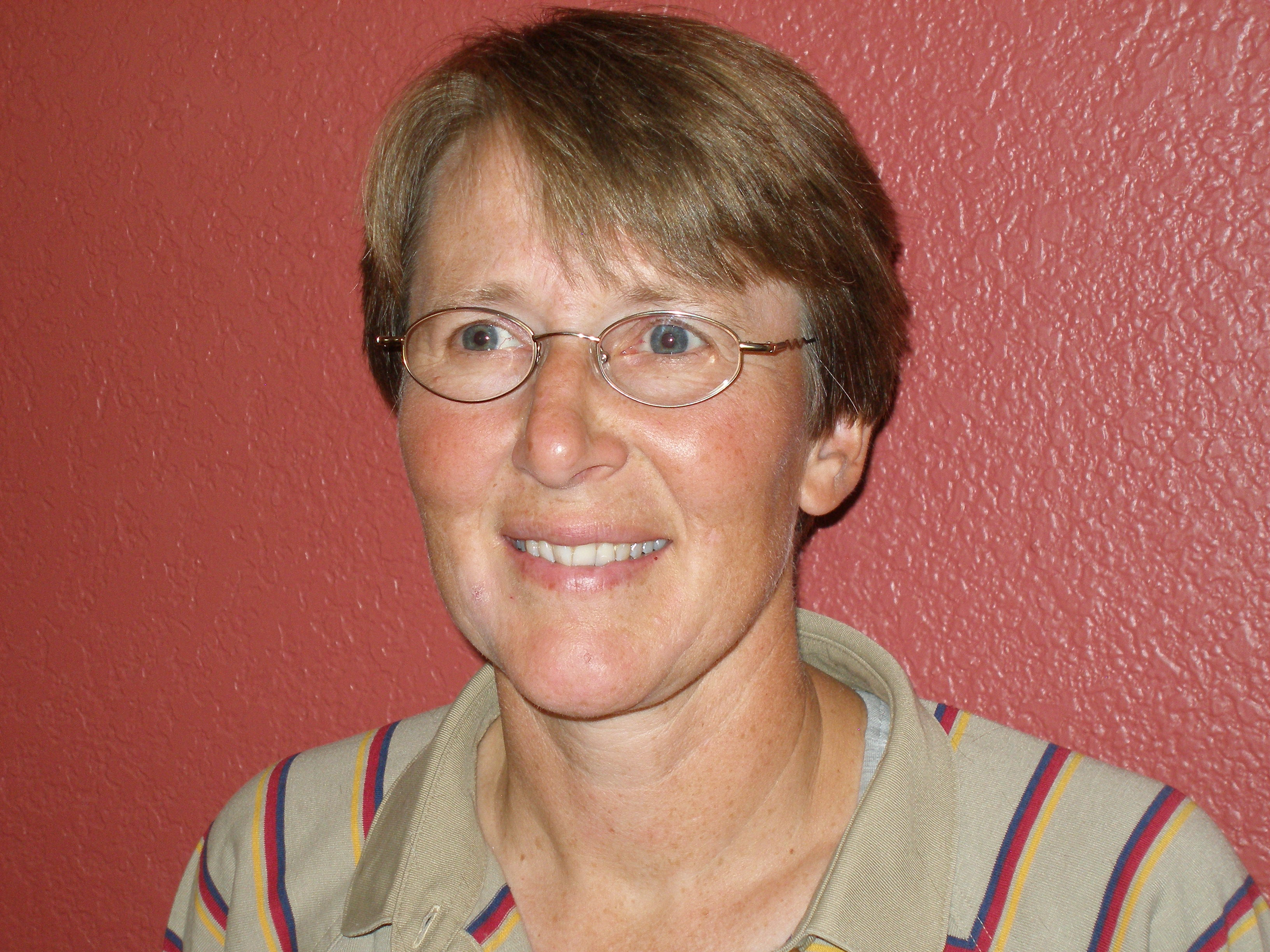
- Education: Reed College; Harvard Divinity School; University of Glasgow
- Occupations: Author; Professor Emeritus, Montana State University Billings, founder of Tapestry
- Organization: Tapestry
- Known for: Speaker and author: Animal Ethics, Intersectional Justice, Ecofeminism
- Notable work: Foundational Books: In Search of Consistency, Sister Species, Animals and World Religions, Eating Earth, Oppressive Liberation, Vegan Ethics: AMORE
- Title: Professor Emeritus, Dr.
- Website: lisakemmerer.com

Lisa Kemmerer is an American academic who has written on animal ethics and environmental ethics. She is professor emeritus of philosophy and religion at Montana State University Billings, and is the author or editor of nine books.

== Life ==
Lisa Kemmerer studied at Reed College, Harvard University, and Glasgow University, where she earned a PhD in ethics. She wrote her dissertation on animal ethics, working across disciplines to include religious ethics and environmental ethics.

Her doctoral thesis became the basis of her first book, In Search of Consistency. Kemmerer taught philosophy and religious studies for almost 20 years at Montana State University Billings, working in ethics, ecofeminism, and intersectional justice. She coined the term anymal and as a speaker, author, and activist, her work took her to Africa, Europe, Asia, South America, and many places in North America.

In 2018, Kemmerer founded Tapestry, a group focused on "care, dignity, and respect" for creatures including humans. Through Tapestry she continues her research and writing.

Kemmerer is the author of sixteen books and more than one hundred articles and anthology chapters.

== Publications ==
- In Search of Consistency: Ethics And Animals. Leiden: Brill, 2006.
- Poetry: Curly Tails and Cloven Hooves. Georgetown, Kentucky: Finishing Line Press, 2011.
- Call to Compassion: Reflections on World Religions and Animal Advocacy (edited with Anthony J. Nocella). New York: Lantern Books, 2011.
- Sister Species: Women, Animals, and Social Justice (edited). Urbana: University of Illinois Press, 2011.
- Primate People: Saving Nonhuman Primates through Education, Advocacy, and Sanctuary (edited). Salt Lake City: University of Utah Press, 2011.
- Animals and World Religions: Rightful Relations. Oxford: Oxford University Press, 2012.
- Speaking Up for Animals: An Anthology of Women's Voices (edited). Boulder: Paradigm Publishers, 2012.
- Bear Necessities: Protecting Bears through Education, Advocacy, and Sanctuary (edited). Leiden: Brill, 2015.
- Animals and the Environment: Advocacy, Activism, and the Quest for Common Ground (edited). London; New York: Routledge, 2015.
- Eating Earth: Environmental Ethics and Dietary Choice. Oxford: Oxford University Press, 2015.
- Animals and Judaism. Tapestry, 2022.
- Animals and Christianity. Tapestry, 2022.
- Animal Ethics: AMORE—Five Reasons to Choose Vegan. Tapestry, 2022.
- Poetry: Affinity. Georgetown, Kentucky: Finishing Line Press. 2023.
- Poetry: WaterWays. Georgetown, Kentucky: Finishing Line Press, 2024.
- Oppressive Liberation: Sexism in Animal Activism. Springer International, 2023.

== See also ==
- List of animal rights advocates
