= Peter Wenz =

American philosopher (born 1945)

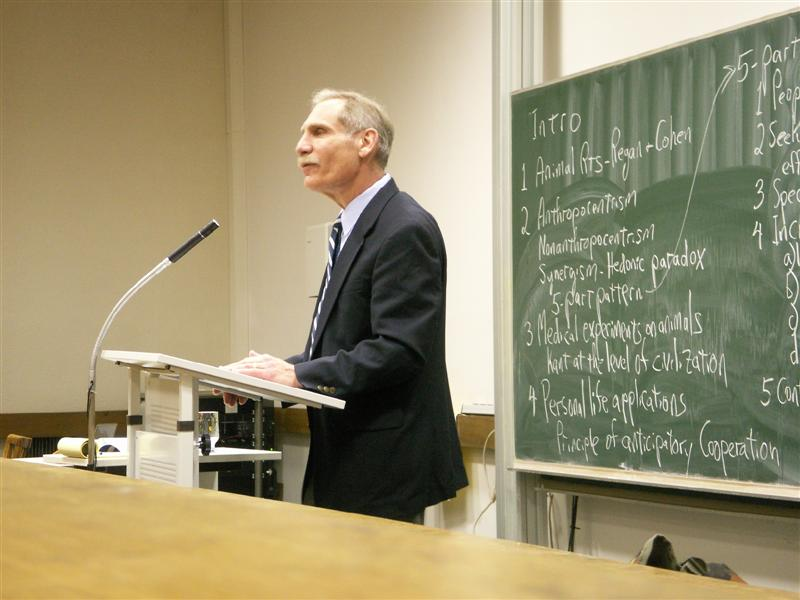
- Wenz in 2006
- Born: United States

Philosophical work
- Era: Contemporary philosophy
- Region: Western philosophy
- School: Analytic philosophy
- Main interests: Applied ethics, Philosophy of law, Environmental ethics, Political philosophy

Peter S. Wenz (born 1945) is an American philosopher who specializes in environmental ethics. He is Professor of Philosophy and Legal Studies at the University of Illinois at Springfield.

== Biography ==
Wenz received his B.A. in philosophy in 1967 from Harpur College of the State University of New York at Binghamton (now Binghamton University) and his Ph.D. in philosophy in 1971 from the University of Wisconsin–Madison. He taught at the University of Wisconsin–Stevens Point from 1971 to 1976 before moving to Springfield. He has also taught at Polytechnic of the South Bank (now South Bank University) in London, England (1980–81); at Aberdeen University in Scotland (1986–87); at Oxford University in England (fall 2003) and at The University of Canterbury in Christchurch, New Zealand (2007). He teaches regularly at the Chautauqua Institution in New York State. Wenz is Professor of Philosophy and Legal Studies at the University of Illinois at Springfield, University Scholar of the University of Illinois, and Adjunct Professor of Medical Humanities at the Southern Illinois University School of Medicine.

He is best known for work in environmental justice, being among those who simultaneously coined the term in the mid-1980s. His most widely reprinted articles are "Just Garbage" and "Minimal Moderate and Extreme Moral Pluralism." Wenz has written academic papers on animal rights and vegetarianism. His specialties include environmental ethics, political remedial philosophy, and medical ethics.

== Selected publications ==
- Wenz, Peter S. An Ecological Argument for Vegetarianism. Ethics and Animals, 1984. Reprinted in Ethical Vegetarianism: From Pythagoras to Peter Singer.
- Wenz, Peter S. (1988). Environmental Justice. New York: SUNY.
- Wenz, Peter S. (1992). Abortion Rights as Religious Freedom. Philadelphia: Temple University Press.
- Laura Westra; Peter S. Wenz, eds. (1995). Faces of Environmental Racism. Lanham MD: Rowman and Littlefield. ISBN 978-0-8476-8045-0.
- Wenz, Peter S. (1996). Nature's Keeper. Philadelphia: Temple University Press.
- Wenz, Peter S. (2001). Environmental Ethics Today. Oxford: Oxford University Press.
- Wenz, Peter S. (2007). Political Philosophies in Moral Conflict. Boston: McGraw-Hill.
- Wenz, Peter S. (2009). Beyond Red and Blue: How Twelve Political Philosophies Shape American Debates., Cambridge. MA: MIT Press.
- Peter S. Wenz. "Tierrechte im sozialen Kontext". Interdisziplinäre Arbeitsgemeinschaft Tierethik (Hrsg.). Tierrechte - Eine interdisziplinäre Herausforderung. Erlangen 2007. ISBN 978-3-89131-417-3
- Wenz, Peter S. (2012). Take Back the Center: Progressive Taxation for a New Progressive Agenda. Cambridge. MA: The MIT Press.
