= Steve F. Sapontzis =

American philosopher (born 1945)

- Born: Steven Frederic Sapontzis; February 9, 1945 (age 81); New York City, New York, U.S.
- Spouse: Jeanne Marie Gocker (m. 1992)

Education
- Education: Rice University (B.A., 1967); University of Paris; Yale University (MPhil, 1970; PhD, 1971)
- Thesis: Merleau-Ponty and Philosophical Methodology (1971)

Philosophical work
- Era: Contemporary philosophy
- Region: Western philosophy
- School: Analytic philosophy
- Institutions: California State University, East Bay
- Main interests: Animal ethics; environmental ethics; meta-ethics
- Notable works: Between the Species; Morals, Reason, and Animals (1987)
- Website: stevesapontzis.com

Signature
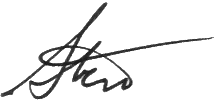

Steven Frederic Sapontzis (born February 9, 1945) is an American moral philosopher. He is professor emeritus of philosophy at California State University, East Bay, and has written on animal ethics, environmental ethics, and meta-ethics. His best-known work is Morals, Reason, and Animals, published in 1987.

Sapontzis has argued that non-human animals should be included within the moral community because they have interests and are capable of suffering. His work criticizes anthropocentrism and speciesism, and discusses the implications of animal ethics for practices including meat-eating, animal testing, and treatment of wild animals.

== Biography ==
=== Early life and education ===
Steven Frederic Sapontzis was born in New York City on February 9, 1945, the son of Zissis Peter Sapontzis and Lea Marie Vial Sapontzis.

Sapontzis obtained his B.A. from Rice University in 1967. He then studied at the University of Paris before enrolling at Yale University, where he earned his MPhil in 1970 and PhD in 1971. His doctoral thesis was titled Merleau-Ponty and Philosophical Methodology.

=== Career ===
Sapontzis joined the philosophy faculty at California State University, Hayward in 1971, and became professor emeritus after his retirement in 1999.

In 1985, Sapontzis co-founded the journal Between the Species and served as one of its first co-editors. He was a member of the board of the American Philosophical Quarterly from 1991 to 1994, and sat on the animal welfare research committee at Lawrence Berkeley Laboratory from 1986 to 1990. He was also one of the first members of the board of directors of the Society for the Study of Ethics and Animals.

Sapontzis has published academic papers on animal ethics, environmental ethics, and meta-ethics. His first book, Morals, Reason, and Animals (1987), examines speciesism and the moral consideration of non-human animals. The organisation Animal Ethics described it retrospectively as an original work in animal ethics. His second book, Subjective Morals (2011), examines moral values and their effects. He also edited Food for Thought: The Debate over Eating Meat (2004).

=== Personal life ===
In 1983, Sapontzis and his future wife established Hayward Friends of Animals, a volunteer initiative supporting their local municipal animal shelter. He married Jeanne Marie Gocker on December 25, 1992. They later operated Second Chance, Helping the Pets of People in Need, an initiative providing assistance to financially disadvantaged people caring for companion animals in California.

== Philosophy ==
Sapontzis criticizes anthropocentric ethics and argues that animals should be included within the moral community because they have interests and are capable of suffering. He maintains that moral personhood should not be limited to humans, but should extend to beings capable of having interests. Sapontzis distinguishes metaphysical personhood, which he associates with being human, from moral personhood, which he associates with capacities such as rationality, choice, and the possession of interests. On this basis, he rejects speciesism as a boundary for moral concern.

Sapontzis has criticized humane slaughter, arguing that the large-scale killing of animals for food involves suffering and the loss of possible future experiences, even when physical pain at the time of killing is reduced. He argues that humane treatment requires recognition of animals' interests rather than treating them only as resources.

Sapontzis argues that animal liberation requires changes in law and in human attitudes toward animals. He has described empathy, moral reflection, and education as means of reducing animal exploitation. He has also supported incremental measures, including higher welfare standards and reduced meat consumption, as steps toward broader changes in human conduct toward animals.

== Selected publications ==
=== Books ===
- —— (1987). Morals, Reason, and Animals. Temple University Press.
- ——, ed. (2004). Food for Thought: The Debate over Eating Meat. Prometheus Books.
- —— (2011). Subjective Morals. University Press of America.

=== Papers ===
- —— (1977). "Direct Perception, Some Further Comments". Philosophy and Phenomenological Research. 37 (4): 556–565. doi:10.2307/2106436. ISSN 0031-8205. JSTOR 2106436.
- —— (1978). "A Note on Merleau-Ponty's "Ambiguity"". Philosophy and Phenomenological Research. 38 (4): 538–543. doi:10.2307/2106575. ISSN 0031-8205. JSTOR 2106575.
- —— (1980). "Are Animals Moral Beings?". American Philosophical Quarterly. 17 (1): 45–52. ISSN 0003-0481. JSTOR 20009783.
- —— (1981). "A Critique of Personhood". Ethics. 91 (4): 607–618. doi:10.1086/292273. ISSN 0014-1704. JSTOR 2380296. S2CID 170292757.
- —— (1983). "Moral Value and Reason". The Monist. 66 (1): 146–159. doi:10.5840/monist19836616. ISSN 0026-9662. JSTOR 27902793.
- —— (1984). "Predation". Ethics and Animals. 5 (2): 27–38. doi:10.15368/ea.1984v5n2.1. ISSN 0197-9094.
- —— (1985). "Moral Community and Animal Rights". American Philosophical Quarterly. 22 (3): 251–257. ISSN 0003-0481. JSTOR 20014103.
- —— (1987). "Moral Relativism: A Causal Interpretation and Defense". American Philosophical Quarterly. 24 (4): 329–337. ISSN 0003-0481. JSTOR 20014210.
- —— (1990). "Groundwork for a Subjective Theory of Ethics". American Philosophical Quarterly. 27 (1): 27–38. ISSN 0003-0481. JSTOR 20014309.

== See also ==
- List of animal rights advocates
