= Animals' Friend Society =

British animal welfare organisation founded in 1832

- Animals' Friend Society for the Prevention of Cruelty to Animals
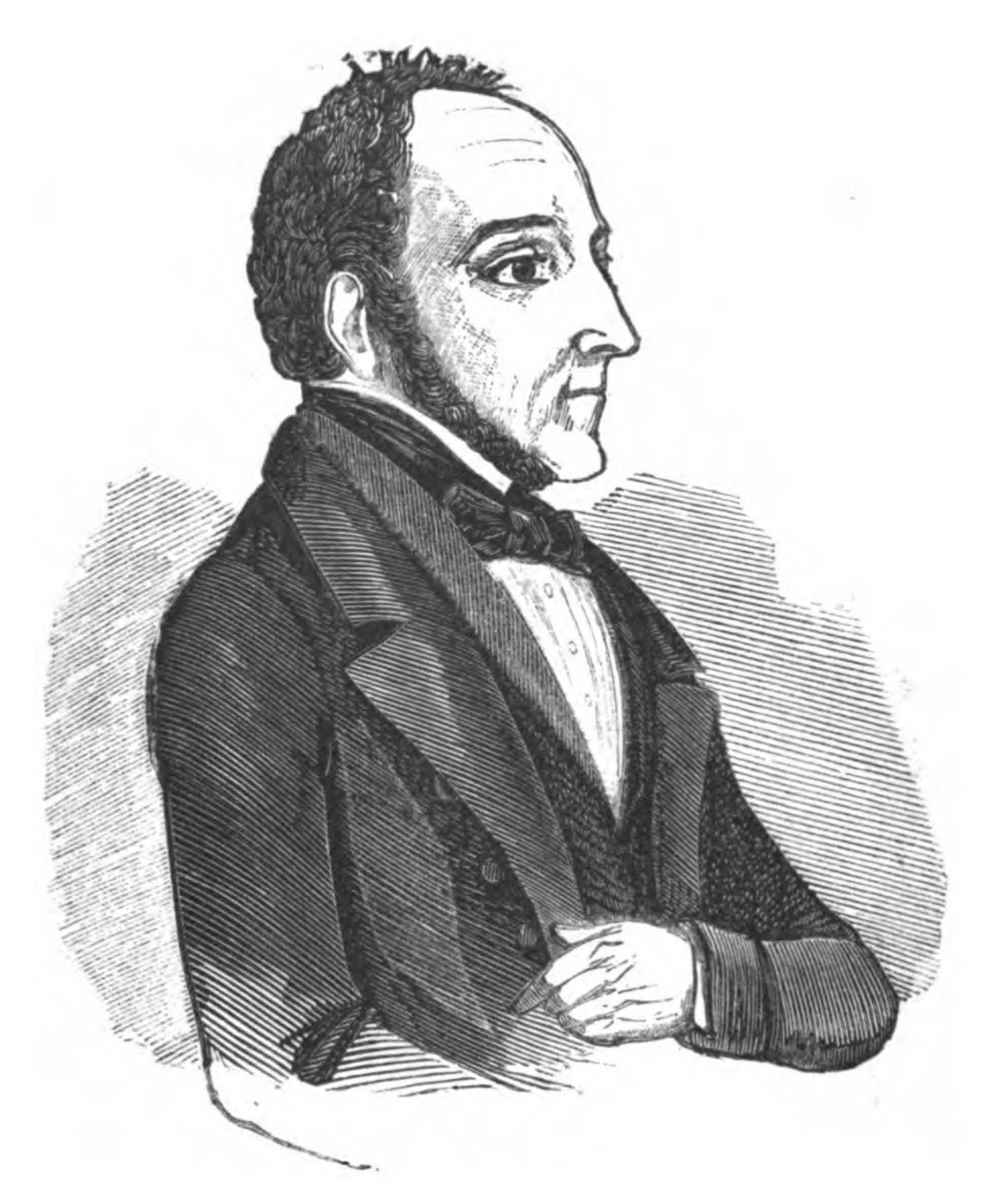
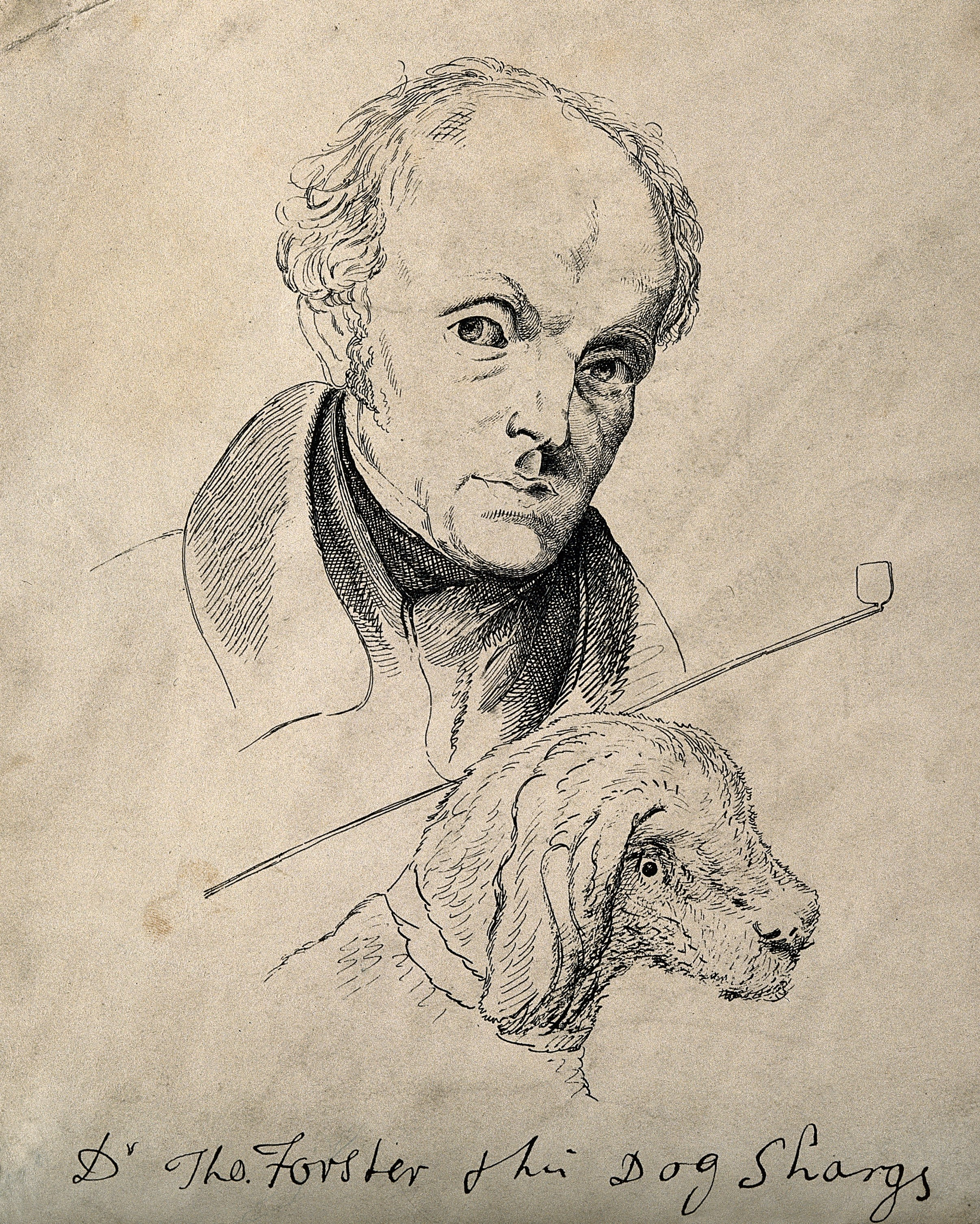
- Lewis Gompertz (left) and T. Forster (right), co-founders of the society
- Founded: 1832; 194 years ago
- Founders: Lewis Gompertz; T. Forster
- Fields: Animal welfare
- Publication: The Animals' Friend, or, the Progress of Humanity (1833–1841)

The Animals' Friend Society for the Prevention of Cruelty to Animals was a British animal welfare organisation founded in London in 1832 by Lewis Gompertz and T. Forster. It was nonsectarian and campaigned against cruelty to animals through publications, investigations and prosecutions. The society ceased functioning in the late 1840s.

== History ==
Lewis Gompertz had been honorary secretary of the Society for the Prevention of Cruelty to Animals (later the RSPCA), but left in 1831 following objections to the vegetarian ideas expressed in his book Moral Inquiries on the Situation of Man and of Brutes (1824). He founded the Animals' Friend Society with T. Forster the following year.

According to historian Chien-hui Li, the society opposed cruelty by members of all social classes at a time when the SPCA concentrated much of its work on abuses associated with the working classes.

By 1841, the society had ten branches in Dover, Canterbury, Gravesend, Birmingham, Walsall, Bristol, Yarmouth, Brighton, Norwich and Manchester. It was then experiencing financial difficulties, and its activities declined.

In 1844, a group seceded to establish the National Animals' Friend Society. Li identifies disagreement over Gompertz's belief in the immortality of animals as one reason for the split. The new society alleged that the original Animals' Friend Society had ceased to exist, but Li identifies evidence of its continued activity after 1844. Gompertz retired from public work because of ill health in 1846. The society was still reporting on the usefulness of birds in agriculture in 1848, but, according to Li, gradually ceased to function during the late 1840s.

=== Later local societies ===
Groups using the Animals' Friend Society name were active in several towns later in the nineteenth century. John Cadbury supported the Birmingham society in the 1850s. Reports of animal protection work under the name appeared in Birmingham newspapers in 1879 and Warwickshire newspapers in 1880.

The Luton Animals' Friend Society was established in 1875. Louisa Bigg was its secretary.

== Publications ==
The society published the illustrated periodical The Animals' Friend, or, the Progress of Humanity from 1833 to 1841, edited by Gompertz. The journal included accounts of animal behaviour and comparisons of human and animal capabilities.
