= Moral Inquiries on the Situation of Man and of Brutes =

1824 treatise by Lewis Gompertz

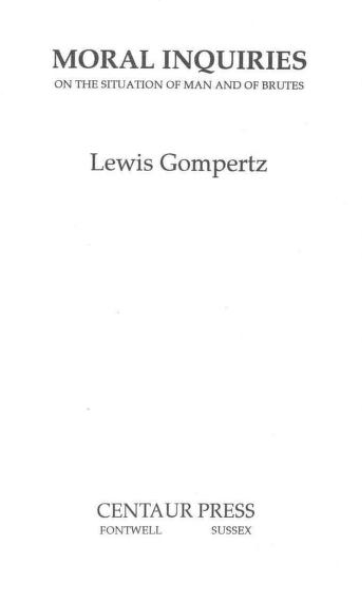
- Title page of 1992 edition
- Author: Lewis Gompertz
- Language: English
- Subjects: Animal ethics; veganism; social reform
- Genre: Treatise
- Publisher: Westley & Parrish
- Publication date: 1824
- Publication place: United Kingdom of Great Britain and Ireland
- Media type: Print (hardback)
- Pages: xi + 175
- OCLC: 8671020

Moral Inquiries on the Situation of Man and of Brutes (Note: Full title: Moral Inquiries on the Situation of Man and of Brutes: On the Crime of Committing Cruelty to Brutes, and of Sacrificing Them to the Purposes of Man; with Further Reflections; Observations on Mr. Martin's Act, on the Vagrant Act, and on the Tread Mills; to Which Are Added Some Improvements in Scapers, or Substitutes for Carriage Wheels; a New Plan of the Same, and Some Other Mechanical Subjects) is an 1824 treatise by the English philosopher and social reformer Lewis Gompertz, published by Westley & Parish. The book argues for the moral consideration of animals and criticises their use for labour, food, clothing, and experimentation. Gompertz maintains that animals, like humans, are sentient and capable of suffering, and argues that human benefit does not justify causing them harm.

The book also discusses social and legal issues, including the treatment of women and the poor, Martin's Act, the Vagrancy Act 1824, and the use of treadmills. Gompertz links animal protection with broader arguments about justice, education, law, and social hierarchy. Later writers and scholars have discussed the work as an early text in the history of animal rights, veganism, and animal ethics.

== Background ==
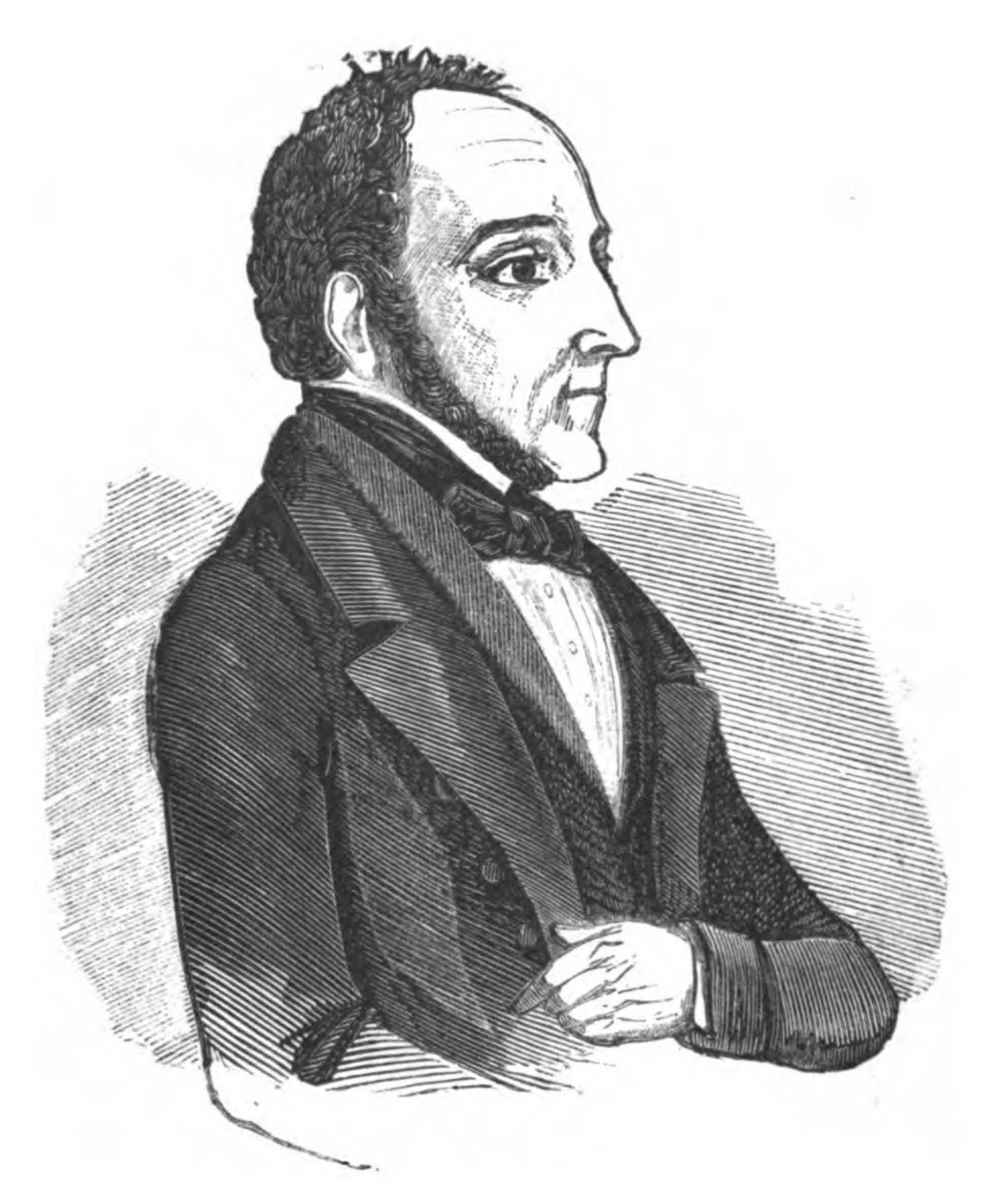
Portrait of Gompertz from Fragments in Defence of Animals (1852)

Lewis Gompertz (1783/4–1861) was an advocate for the moral consideration of animals, a mechanical inventor, and a co-founder of the Society for the Prevention of Cruelty to Animals (later the RSPCA).

Born into a Jewish family in London, Gompertz opposed animal exploitation and avoided animal products. He also used mechanical alternatives to animal labour. Moral Inquiries on the Situation of Man and of Brutes combined philosophical argument with proposals for animal protection and social reform, including criticism of capitalism and the subordination of women.

After leaving the SPCA because of sectarian exclusions, Gompertz founded the Animals' Friend Society, which he and his wife ran until poor health forced his retirement. He also published on mechanical inventions intended to reduce animal suffering.

== Publication history ==
Moral Inquiries on the Situation of Man and of Brutes was printed by Richard Taylor and published by Westley & Parrish, who sold it from their premises opposite St. Clement Danes on the Strand, London.

In 1992, a new edition was published by Centaur Press, edited by Peter Singer, who also wrote the foreword. Edwin Mellen Press published an edition in 1997, edited by Charles R. Magel.

In 2024, to mark the bicentenary of the book, Animal Ethics republished it as a free digital edition.

== Summary ==
Gompertz begins by discussing moral progress and the possibility that ethical concern might be extended to animals. He criticises the treatment of working animals, especially horses, and contrasts different methods of slaughter. He argues that cruelty is encouraged by education and custom, and that humans and animals differ in physical capacities rather than in the basic moral relevance of suffering. He also considers whether animals might share in a future state.

Gompertz compares the condition of humans and animals in nature and in civilisation. He argues that human domination of animals rests on habit and social convention rather than inherent superiority. He also connects animal exploitation with other forms of social hierarchy, including the treatment of women and the poor. The book discusses wild animal suffering, including hunger, fear, and predation, and Gompertz suggests that the disappearance of carnivorous species might reduce suffering in nature.

The work then sets out moral axioms and theorems on topics including personal identity, punishment, and future existence. Gompertz argues that reason supports the view that animals have moral rights comparable to those of humans, and rejects conventional claims of human superiority.

A later section uses dialogue to examine the morality of killing animals for food. Gompertz criticises slaughter and argues against the use of milk, eggs, and other animal products. He also objects to the use of leather, silk, and wool, and argues that a plant-based diet is more consistent with moral principle.

Gompertz also questions the use of horses for labour, arguing that it is based on human convenience rather than necessity. He compares this with other forms of exploitation and presents reason and conscience as the proper guides for the treatment of animals.

The final parts of the book discuss legal reform. Gompertz criticises Martin's Act for giving animals insufficient protection and comments on the Vagrancy Act 1824 and treadmills, comparing the harsh treatment of humans under these laws with cruelty to animals. He concludes by proposing a bill to strengthen legal protections for animals.

== Reception ==
An 1825 review in the Monthly Review described the book's structure as "puzzling", but praised its moral outlook. The reviewer wrote that Gompertz advanced "excellent principles, as applied to all points of a public nature", and that the "tendency of most of the author's proposals and observations is humane and laudable". The review criticised some of the book's judgments but concluded that it deserved the "attention of magistrates and men in power".

== Legacy ==
=== 19th-century responses ===
In 1839, the astronomer and naturalist T. Forster published a treatise addressed to Gompertz titled Philozoia, or Moral Reflections on the Actual Condition of the Animal Kingdom, and the Means of Improving the Same.

Moral Inquiries on the Situation of Man and of Brutes was later included in Henry S. Salt's bibliography of animal rights literature in his 1892 book Animals' Rights: Considered in Relation to Social Progress.

=== Later commentary ===
Gary L. Francione and Anne E. Charlton describe Gompertz's work as "one of the most progressive and radical books on animal ethics ever written, yet virtually unknown".

In the foreword to the 1992 edition, Peter Singer wrote that he was surprised to find many of Gompertz's arguments resembling arguments later associated with the animal liberation movement.

In a 1994 review, Stephen Bostock noted Gompertz's methodical approach to ethics, writing that his work "attempts to argue rigorously from firm foundations with an elaborate apparatus of definitions, axioms and theorems". Bostock also noted Gompertz's fairness to opponents, intellectual honesty, and relevance to later ethical questions.

Animal Ethics describes the book as the "most significant work in animal ethics until the late 20th century", citing its early advocacy of ideas now associated with veganism, antispeciesism, and concern for wild animal suffering.
