= Lewis Gompertz =

English philosopher and social reformer (1783/4–1861)

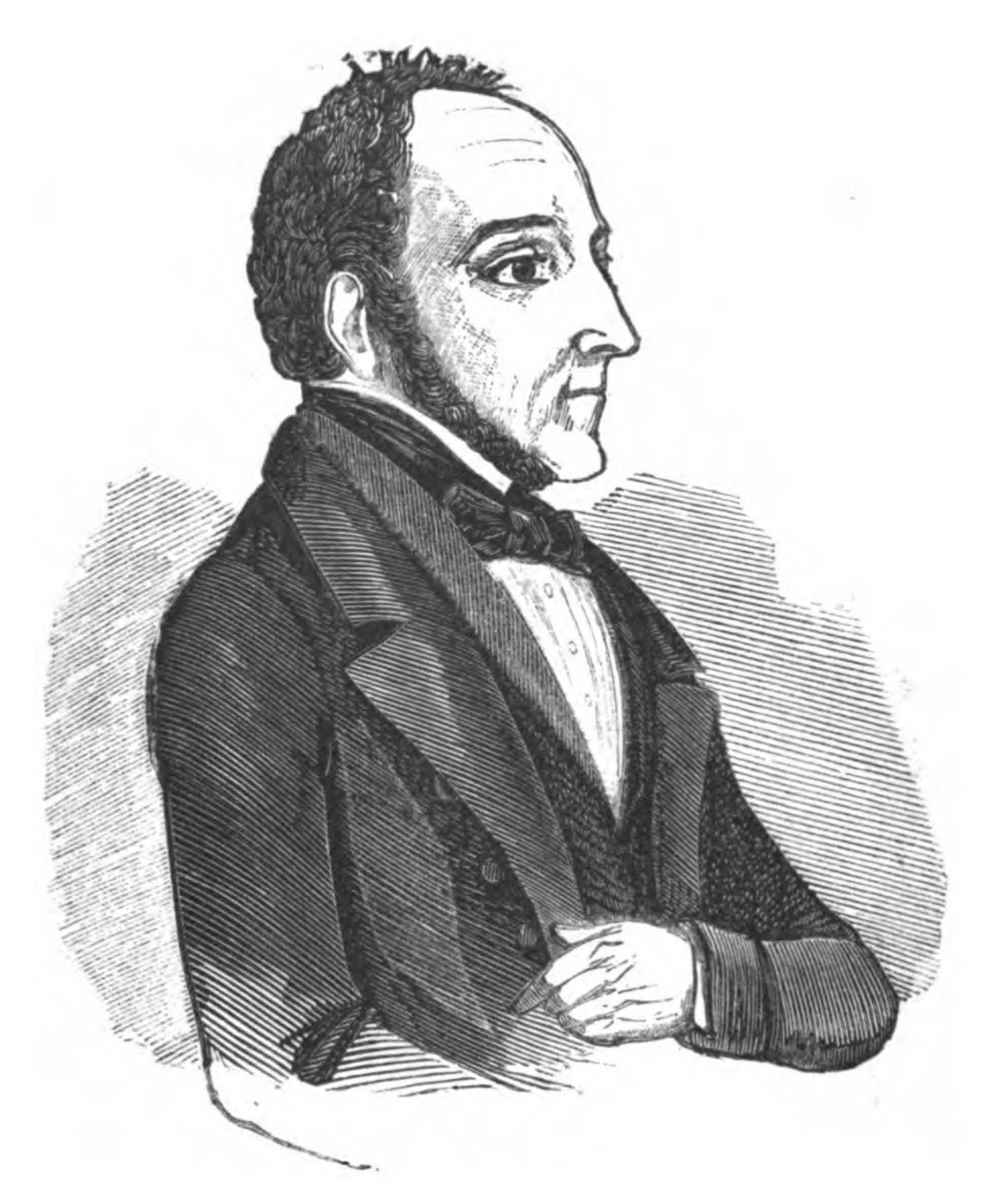
- Portrait from Fragments in Defence of Animals (1852)
- Born: 1783/4; London, England
- Died: 2 December 1861 (aged 77); Kennington, London, England
- Occupations: Philosopher; writer; inventor; social reformer
- Years active: c. 1814–1852
- Known for: Advocacy for the moral consideration of animals and early veganism
- Notable work: Moral Inquiries on the Situation of Man and of Brutes (1824)
- Spouse: Ann Hollaman (m. 1809; died 1847)
- Relatives: Benjamin Gompertz (brother); Isaac Gompertz (brother)
- Family: Gompertz family

Lewis Gompertz (1783/4 – 2 December 1861) was an English philosopher, writer, inventor, and social reformer associated with early animal protection in Britain. Born into a Jewish family of London diamond merchants, he argued that killing or using animals for human purposes was morally wrong. He avoided animal products and other goods derived from animals, a practice later described as an early form of veganism.

Gompertz was a founding member of the Society for the Prevention of Cruelty to Animals (later the RSPCA), served as its honorary secretary from 1828, and resigned in 1833 after the society adopted an explicitly Christian constitution. He then co-founded the Animals' Friend Society with T. Forster, ran it with his wife Ann, and edited its periodical Animals' Friend, or, The Progress of Humanity from 1833 to 1841. Gompertz set out his views in Moral Inquiries on the Situation of Man and of Brutes (1824), which also discussed capitalism, the position of women, and Owenite social reform. He later published Fragments in Defence of Animals, and Essays on Morals, Soul, and Future State (1852). His mechanical inventions included designs intended to reduce reliance on animal labour for transport.

== Biography ==
=== Early life and family ===
Lewis Gompertz was born in 1783 or 1784 to a large Jewish family of London diamond merchants. The family descended from the Ashkenazi Gomperz line of Emmerich, near the Germany–Netherlands border, and was active in the Hambro Synagogue in Hoxton, East London.

Gompertz was the youngest of fifteen children of Solomon Barent Gompertz (1729–c. 1807), a merchant based in Walthamstow and Vauxhall, and the fifth son from Solomon's second marriage, to Leah Cohen (c. 1747–1809). He was the younger brother of the mathematician and actuary Benjamin Gompertz, and the poet Isaac Gompertz.

Because they were Jewish, Gompertz and his siblings were barred from attending university, and instead received an informal education that stressed critical thinking and problem-solving. Gompertz married Ann Hollaman at St Leonard's, Shoreditch, on 12 December 1809.

=== Ethical views and publications ===
Gompertz opposed animal suffering and argued that it was wrong to kill animals or use them in ways that did not benefit the animals themselves. He avoided animal products, including milk and eggs, and refused to travel by horse-drawn coach because of the exploitation of horses. He also avoided wearing leather and silk, and opposed hunting and animal experimentation.

His philosophical views were set out in his 1824 treatise, Moral Inquiries on the Situation of Man and of Brutes, which uses dialogues, moral axioms, and practical proposals to discuss the treatment of animals. The book also criticised capitalism, condemned the subordination of women, and supported Owenite cooperation and social reform.

[C]ruelty is cruelty under whatever colouring it may appear; and whether exercised on a man or on a fly, cruelty is still cruelty. It matters not whether the victim be furnished with two legs or with four, with wings, with fins, or with arms; where there is sensation, there is subject for cruelty, and in proportion to the degree of sensation will its action operate.

— Moral Inquiries on the Situation of Man and of Brutes, pp. 149–150

In 1852, he published Fragments in Defence of Animals, and Essays on Morals, Soul, and Future State, a second volume that collected later writings and developed arguments from Moral Inquiries.

=== Animal protection organisations ===
Gompertz was a founding member of the Society for the Prevention of Cruelty to Animals (SPCA) and attended its inaugural meeting in 1824. During a period of financial difficulty for the society, he took on several responsibilities, serving as honorary secretary from 1828, acting as de facto treasurer, and contributing personal funds. In 1832, the SPCA awarded him a silver medal for his service.

Gompertz's position within the SPCA became contentious amid internal disputes, including rivalry with the Association for the Promotion of Rational Humanity to the Animal Creation. Claims that he held Pythagorean views and was hostile to Christianity contributed to tensions. In 1833, after the SPCA amended its constitution to adopt explicitly Christian principles, Gompertz resigned, saying that the change effectively excluded him on religious grounds.

After leaving the SPCA, Gompertz co-founded the Animals' Friend Society with T. Forster, and managed it with his wife Ann until 1846. The society drew support from evangelicals and Quakers, and for a period was more active than the SPCA. Gompertz edited its journal, Animals' Friend, or, The Progress of Humanity, from 1833 to 1841. He withdrew from public work in 1846 because of ill health, and his wife's death in 1847 further affected him. Although the society's committee continued to meet until 1848, it then declined.

=== Inventions ===
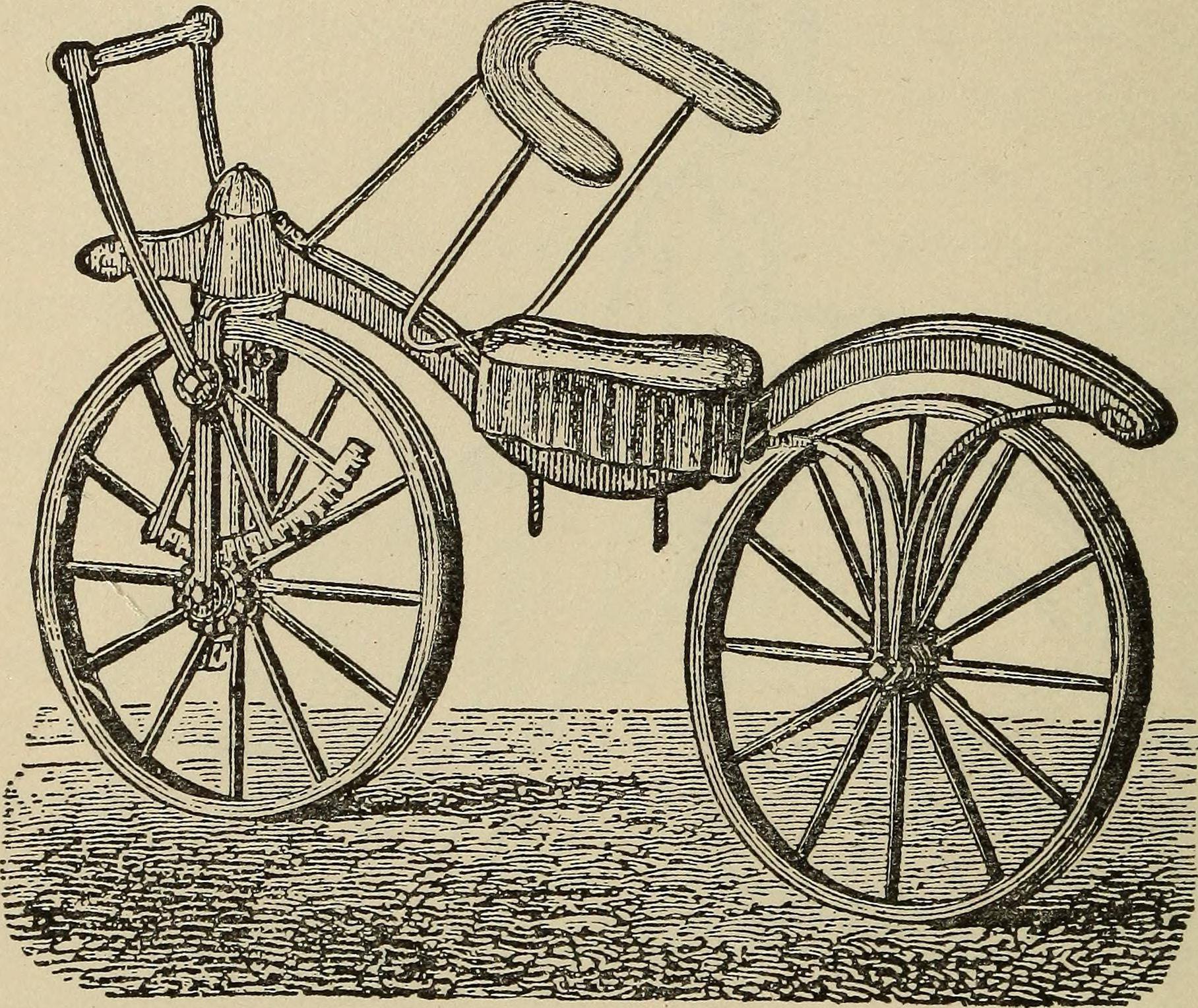
Gompertz's improvement on Baron von Drais's draisine, 1821

Gompertz had an interest in mechanical engineering. According to Peter Singer, his inventions, though sometimes impractical, were intended to reduce animal suffering. His devices were displayed at his home and later at the Adelaide Gallery. He filed one patent, for carriages (no. 3804 of 1814), and around 1839 issued an Index to 38 Inventions. His designs included an expanding chuck, alternatives to gear wheels, and a modified velocipede intended to avoid the use of animals for transport. His work was discussed in periodicals including the Mechanics Journal and Animals' Friend, and was later collected in Mechanical Inventions and Suggestions on Land and Water Locomotion (1851), which went through at least two editions. In the preface, Gompertz stated that many of the devices had been publicly exhibited, and that he had been awarded a medal by Prince Albert for some of them.

=== Death ===
Gompertz died of bronchitis on 2 December 1861, aged 77, at his home in Kennington, London. He was buried with his wife in the churchyard of Kennington Church.

== Legacy ==
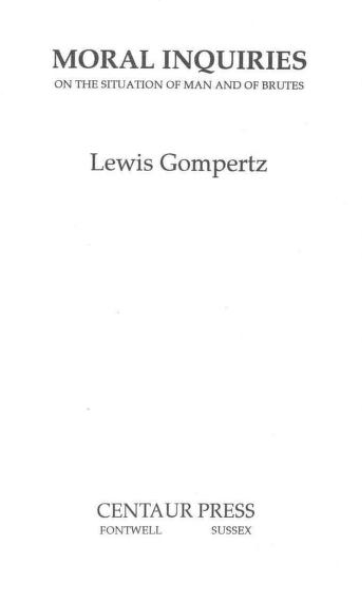
Title page of the 1992 reprint of Moral Inquiries on the Situation of Man and of Brutes

In 1992, Centaur Press issued a new edition of Moral Inquiries on the Situation of Man and of Brutes, edited by the philosopher Peter Singer, who also wrote the foreword. Singer wrote that he was surprised to discover Gompertz's work and compared Gompertz's arguments with arguments later associated with the animal liberation movement. A different edition was published in 1997 by Edwin Mellen Press, edited by Charles R. Magel.

In 2023, Barry Kew published Lewis Gompertz: Philosopher, Activist, Philanthropist, Inventor, described as the first full-length biography of Gompertz. The book discusses Gompertz's advocacy for animals and for other causes, including women's rights, the treatment of apprentices, prisoners, enslaved people, and poverty relief. Kew situates Moral Inquiries within Gompertz's effort to develop and apply a rational, egalitarian moral philosophy in tension with contemporary religious and social norms. He also discusses anti-Jewish sectarianism and racism faced by Gompertz, and argues that these factors contributed to Gompertz receiving less attention in later histories than the range of his reform work might otherwise suggest.

In 2024, to mark the bicentenary of its publication, Moral Inquiries on the Situation of Man and of Brutes was republished as a free digital edition by Animal Ethics. The organisation described Gompertz as an early contributor to animal ethics and characterised Moral Inquiries as the most important work on the subject before the late 20th century. It said that the book anticipated ideas later associated with veganism, antispeciesism, and concern for wild animal suffering, and argued that many of Gompertz's arguments remain relevant to contemporary ethical debate.

== Selected publications ==
- Moral Inquiries on the Situation of Man and of Brutes. London: Westley & Parrish. 1824.
- Index to 38 Inventions of L. G. London. 1839.
- Mechanical Inventions and Suggestions on Land and Water Locomotion. London: W. Horsell. 1851.
- Fragments in Defence of Animals, and Essays on Morals, Soul, and Future State. London: W. Horsell. 1852.

== See also ==
- List of animal rights advocates
