= Animal ethics =

Moral status and treatment of nonhuman animals

Animal ethics is a branch of ethics which examines human-animal relationships, the moral consideration of animals and how nonhuman animals ought to be treated. The subject matter includes animal rights, animal welfare, animal law, speciesism, animal cognition, wildlife conservation, wild animal suffering, the moral status of nonhuman animals, the concept of nonhuman personhood, human exceptionalism, the history of animal use, and theories of justice. Several different theoretical approaches have been proposed to examine this field, in accordance with the different theories currently defended in moral and political philosophy. There is no theory which is completely accepted due to the differing understandings of what is meant by the term ethics; however, there are theories that are more widely accepted by society such as animal rights and utilitarianism.

Some ethicists use the term speciesism to describe discrimination against beings on the basis of species, in a way that is morally analogous to racism or sexism. This usage holds that differences in species membership alone do not justify differential moral consideration if the beings in question share morally relevant capacities such as sentience.

== History ==
The history of the regulation of animal research was a fundamental step towards the development of animal ethics, as this was when the term "animal ethics" first emerged. In the beginning, the term "animal ethics" was associated solely with cruelty, only changing in the late 20th century, when it was deemed inadequate in modern society. The United States Animal Welfare Act of 1966, attempted to tackle the problems of animal research; however, their effects were considered futile. Many did not support this act as it communicated that if there was human benefit resulting from the tests, the suffering of the animals was justifiable. It was not until the establishment of the animal rights movement that people started supporting and voicing their opinions in public. Animal ethics was expressed through this movement and led to big changes to the power and meaning of animal ethics.

== Animal rights ==
The first animal rights laws were introduced between 1635 and 1780. In 1635, Ireland was the first country to pass animal protection legislation, the Cruelty to Horses and Sheep Act 1634. In 1641, Massachusetts colony's called Body of Liberties that includes regulation against any "Tirranny or Crueltie" towards animals. In 1687, Japan reintroduced a ban on eating meat and killing animals. In 1789, philosopher Jeremy Bentham argued in An Introduction to the Principles of Morals and Legislation, that an animal's capacity to suffer—not their intelligence—meant that they should be granted rights: "The question is not, Can they reason? nor, Can they talk? but, Can they suffer? Why should the law refuse its protection to any sensitive being?"

Between 1822 and 1892, more laws were passed to protect animals. In 1822, the British Parliament passed the Cruel Treatment of Cattle Act. In 1824, the first animal rights society was founded in England by Richard Martin, Arthur Broome, Lewis Gompertz and William Wilberforce, the Society for the Prevention of Cruelty to Animals, which later became the RSPCA. The same year, Gompertz published Moral Inquiries on the Situation of Man and of Brutes, one of the first books advocating for what will be more than a century later known as veganism. In 1835, Britain passed the first Cruelty to Animals Act. In 1866, the American Society for the Prevention of Cruelty to Animals was founded by New Yorker Henry Bergh. In 1875, Frances Power Cobbe established the National Anti-Vivisection Society in Britain. In 1892, English social reformer Henry Stephens Salt published Animal Rights: Considered in Relation to Social Progress.

In 1970, Richard D. Ryder coined speciesism, a term for discrimination against animals based on their species-membership. This term was popularized by the philosopher and ethicist Peter Singer in his 1975 book Animal Liberation.

The late 1970s marked the beginnings of the animal rights movement, which portrayed the belief that animals must be recognised as sentient beings and protected from unessential harm. Since the 18th century, many groups have been organised supporting different aspects of animal rights and carrying out their support in differing ways. On one hand, "The Animal Liberation Front" is an English group that took the law into their own hands, orchestrating the Penn break-in, while a group such as "People for Ethical Treatment of Animals" founded in the US, although supporting the same goals, aim for legislative gains.

== Animal farming ==
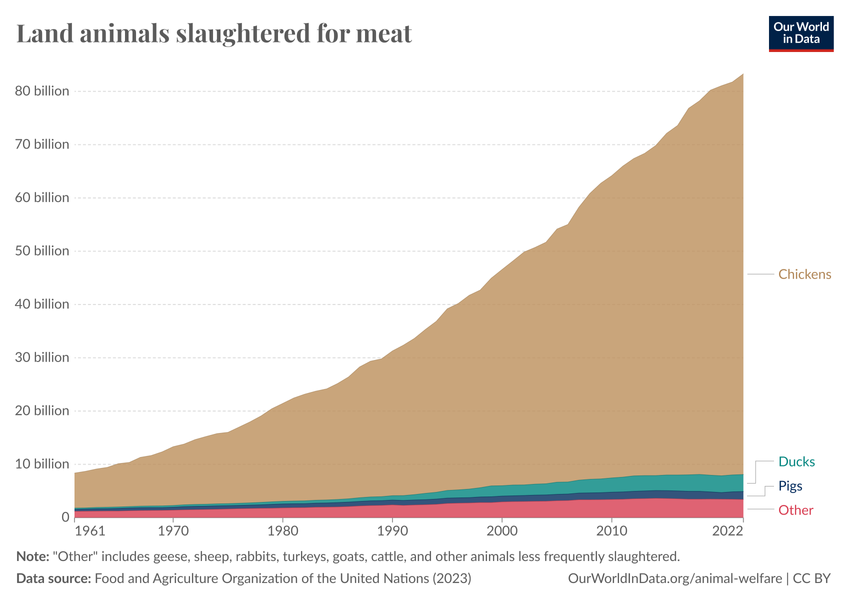
Over 80 billions of land animals are slaughtered for meat every year.

In 2023, it is estimated that 74% of all land livestock are factory farmed. In the United States, 99% of all livestock was estimated in 2017 to be factory farmed, despite 75% of US adults thinking that the animal products they consume come from animals that are treated "humanely".

Factory farming, or intensive animal farming, is characterized by densely confined animals and comes with a range of issues, including:

- Confinement methods – Many animals, such as egg-laying hens, are kept in cages with limited space to move. Similarly, pregnant pigs are often kept in gestation crates, which are so small that the animals cannot turn around.
- Aggressiveness – In densely confined environments without intellectual stimulation, animals tend to become aggressive, sometimes also engaging in cannibalism.
- Mutilations – These procedures are often intended to reduce aggression in these environments and are typically performed without anesthetic. Examples include trimming the beaks of chickens, and clipping the teeth and tails of piglets. Piglets are also frequently castrated to avoid a bad smell that can sometimes develop in the meat. Routine tail clipping is considered a traumatic practice for pigs and is banned in Europe, but the ban is often ignored in practice.
- Genetic selection – Farmed animals are typically genetically selected to increase productivity. For instance, chickens often struggle to walk due to their unnatural weight, which can also lead to heart and lung problems.
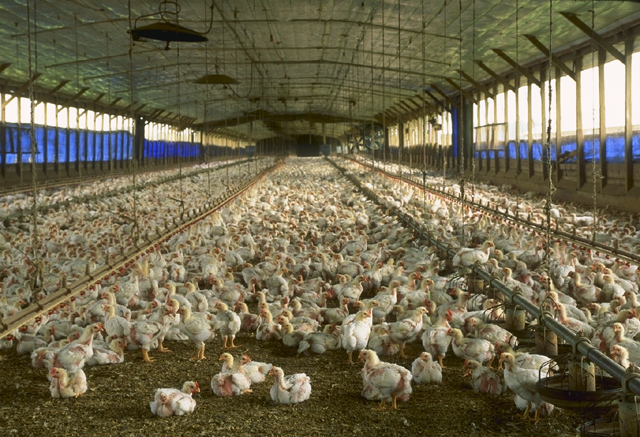
  A chicken farm in Florida.
- Diseases – The lack of genetic diversity and the density of animals in confinement can lead to the spread of diseases, some of which can also be transmitted to humans.
- Artificial insemination – Animals are frequently impregnated through artificial insemination, a process carried out by humans.
- Early separations from mothers
- Stress

Despite their vast numbers, factory farmed animals are relatively ignored. Species that appear more different from humans, such as fish or insects, are often particularly overlooked.

Intensive animal farming is sometimes described as one of the worst moral catastrophes in history. According to Jacy Reese Anthis, even farms considered high-welfare typically have serious welfare issues, notably due to genetic selection. He argues that truly ethical animal farms would be prohibitively expensive for consumers. Movements such as "conscientious omnivores" oppose factory farming but not all animal farming. Peter Singer suggests that even as a vegan, there are a few exceptions like oysters that are ethically acceptable to eat because they cannot suffer and their farming is environmentally sustainable.

One proposed solution to reduce farmed animal suffering is to develop plant-based and cultured alternatives to animal products.

=== Insects ===
There is uncertainty on whether insects are sentient and can feel pain. Insects often continue normal feeding and mating behaviours after catastrophic injuries. But they display aversive experiences to other stimuli like heat. Studies on bees notably showed multiple markers of sentience, such as the ability to strategically avoid threats or harmful situations unless the reward is significant.

The rapidly growing industry of insect farming is often presented as a solution to the environmental degradation caused by traditional animal farming. But a significant part of the crops fed to insects is edible for human, and farmed insects are often fed to livestock rather than directly to humans, which increases inefficiency. In 2023, more than one trillion insects were farmed annually, with little to no formal welfare standards in place, leaving companies to determine their own practices.

== Wild animal ethics ==
Animal ethics is also concerned with animals that are not used as resources by human beings, in particular those living in the wild. Such animals can be harmed by humans in many ways, for example by being poisoned by products that humans use or killed in large numbers when they are regarded as too numerous.

Beyond the harms caused by humans, wild animals face a range of natural threats that can cause them to suffer significantly and to die very young, such as disease, hostile weather conditions, hunger and thirst, conflict and accidents. Because the number of sentient animals living in the wild is extremely large, the aggregate suffering involved has been argued to be very substantial. Proposed and existing forms of assistance to wild animals include rescuing trapped animals; helping injured, sick or orphaned animals; aiding animals during harmful weather events; and vaccination programmes for wild animals, although such initiatives remain very limited.

Some ethical positions have been taken to imply that the situation of wild animals deserves special attention. Views that give priority to those who are worse off, such as egalitarianism and prioritarianism, as well as suffering-focused ethics, have been argued to entail that the large amount of suffering experienced by wild animals should be a matter of special concern.

== Animal testing ==
Animal testing for biomedical research dates to the writings of the ancient Greeks. It is understood that physician-scientists such as Aristotle, and Erasistratus carried out experiments on living animals. After them, there was also Galen, who was Greek but resided in Rome, carrying out experiments on living animals to improve on the knowledge of anatomy, physiology, pathology, and pharmacology. Animal testing since has evolved considerably and is still being carried out in the modern-day, with millions of experimental animals being used around the world. However, during recent years it has come under severe criticism by the public and animal activist groups. Those against, argue that the benefits that animal testing provides for humanity are not justifiable for the suffering of those animals. Those for, argue that animal testing is fundamental for the advancement of biomedical knowledge.

Drug testing on animals blew up in the 20th century. In 1937, a US pharmaceutical company created an infamous drug called "Elixir Sulfanilamide". This drug had a chemical called DEG in it which is toxic to humans, but at the time was not known to be harmful to humans. Without precautions, the drug was released to the public and was responsible for a mass poisoning. The DEG ended up killing over a hundred people, causing uproar among civilisation. Thus, in 1938 the U.S. Food and Drug Administration (FDA) established the Federal Food, Drug and Cosmetic Act. This ensured the testing of drugs on animals before marketing of the product, to confirm that it would have no harmful implications on humans.

However, since the regulations have been put in place, animal testing deaths have increased. More than one million animals are killed from testing every year in the US. In addition, the deaths of these animals are considered sickening; from inhaling toxic gas, having skin burned off, getting holes drilled into their skulls.

=== The Three Rs ===
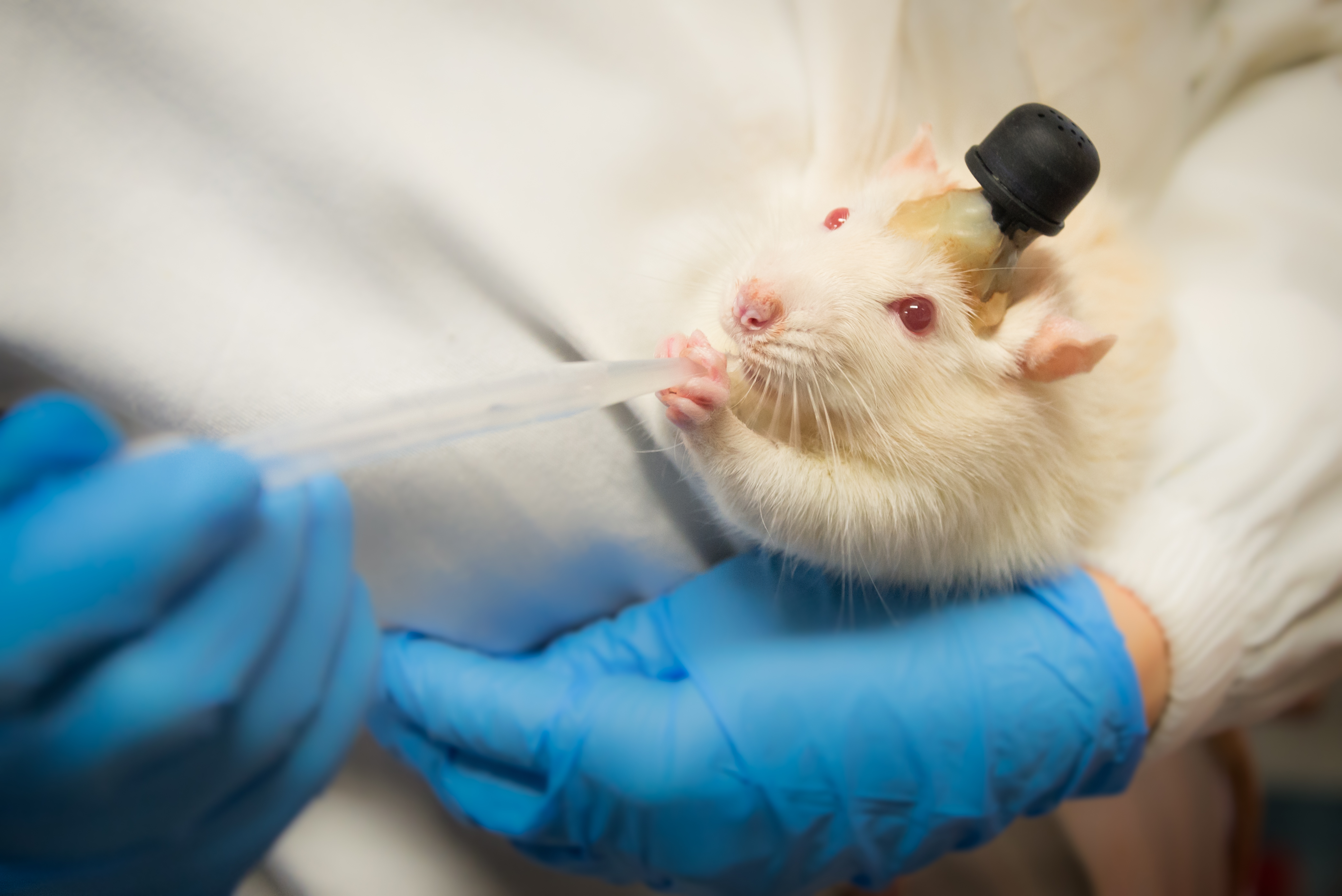
Laboratory rat with a brain implant being fed

The Three Rs were first introduced in a 1959 book called "The Principles of Humane Experimental technique" by zoologist W. M. S. Russell, and microbiologist R. L. Burch. The Three Rs stand for Replacement, Reduction, and Refinement and are the guiding principles for the ethical treatment of animals used for testing and experimentation:

1. Replacement: Avoiding using an animal for testing by switching out the animal for something non-living, such as a computer model, or an animal which is less susceptible to pain in relation to the experiment.
2. Reduction: Devising a plan to use the fewest animals possible; a combination of using fewer animals to gain sufficient data, and maximising the amount of data from each animal to use fewer animals.
3. Refinement: A decrease in any unnecessary pain inflicted on the animal; adapting experimental procedures to minimise suffering.

The Three Rs principles are now widely accepted by many countries and are used in any practises that involve the experimentation of animals.

=== Ethical guidelines for animal research ===
There is a wide range of ethical assessments regarding animals used in research. There are general opinions that animals do have a moral status and how they are treated should be subjected to ethical consideration; some of the positions include:

- Animals have intrinsic values that must be respected.
- Animals can feel pain and their interests must be taken into consideration.
- Our treatment of all animals/lab animals reflects on our attitudes and influences us on our moral beings.

The Norwegian National Committee for Research Ethics in Science and Technology (NENT) have a set of ethical guidelines for the use of animals in research:

1. Respect Animal Dignity: Researchers must have respect towards the animals' worth, regardless of their value and the animals' interests as living, sentient creatures. Researchers have to have respect when choosing their topics/methods, and when expanding their research. Researchers also have to supply care that is adapted to needs to each laboratory animal.
2. Responsibility for considering options (Replace): When there are alternatives available, researchers are responsible for studying those alternatives for animal experimentation. When there are no good alternatives available, researchers have to consider if the research can be postponed until a good alternative are developed. While being able to justify the experiments on animals, researchers then have to be accountable for the absence of alternative options and the urge to obtain the knowledge immediately.
3. The principle of proportionality: responsibility for considering and balancing suffering and benefit: Researchers have to consider both the risks of pain and suffering that laboratory animals will face and assess them in the value of the relationship to the research of animals, people, and the environment. Researchers have a responsibility on whether or not the research will have improvements for the animals, people or the environment. All of the possible benefits of the study has to be considered, substantiated and specified in both the short and long run. This responsibility also entails the obligation to consider both the scientific quality of the experiment and whether or not the experiment will have relevant scientific benefits. Suffering can only be caused by animals if there is a counterbalance of substantial and probable benefits for animals, people or the environment. Since there are many methods of analyzing the harm and the benefits, research institutions have to provide training on suitable models and researchers have the responsibility to use the methods of analysis when planning any experiments on animals (see guideline 5).
4. Responsibility for considering reducing the number of animals (Reduce): Researchers have the responsibility to consider whether or not it's acceptable to reduce the number of animals that an experiment's plan on using and include the number necessary to both the scientific quality of the experiments and the relevance to the results only. Before the experiment, researchers have to conduct reading studies and consider alternative designs and perform the calculations that are needed before beginning an experiment.
5. Responsibility for minimizing the risk of suffering and improving animal welfare (Refine): Researchers have the responsibility to assess the expected effect on laboratory animals. Researchers have to lessen the risk of suffering and provide excellent animal welfare. Suffering includes pain, hunger, malnutrition, thirst, abnormal cold/heat. fear, stress, illness, injury, and restrictions to where the animal cannot be able to behave naturally and normally. To find out what is a considerable amount of suffering, a researcher's assessment should be based on which animal suffers the most. Considering the animals is the deciding factor if there are any doubts about regarding the suffering the animals will face. Researchers have to consider the direct suffering that the animal might endure during an experiment, but there are risks before and after the suffering, including breeding, transportation, trapping, euthanizing, labeling, anesthetizing, and stabling. This means that all the researchers have to take into account the needs of periods for adaptation before and after an experiment.
6. Responsibility for maintaining biological diversity: Researchers are also responsible for ensuring that the use of laboratory animals do not disrupt or endanger biological diversity. This means that researchers have to consider the consequences to the stock and their ecosystem as a whole. The use of endangered species has to be reduced to a minimum. When there is credible and uncertain knowledge that the inclusion of animals in research and the use of certain methods may have ethically unacceptable consequences for the stock and the ecosystem as a whole, researchers must observe the precautionary principle.
7. Responsibility when intervening in a habitat: Researchers have a responsibility for reducing the disruption and any impact of the natural behaviors of the animals, including those who are not direct test subjects in research, as well as the population and their surroundings. Most research and technology-related projects, like the ones regarding environmental technology and surveillance, might impact the animals and their living arrangements. In those cases, researchers have to seek to observe the principle of proportionality and to decrease possible negative impact(see guideline 3).
8. Responsibility for openness and sharing of data and material: Researchers have the responsibility for ensuring the transparency of the research findings and facilitating sharing the data and materials from all animal experiments. Transparency and sharing are important in order to not repeat the same experiments on animals. Transparency is also important in order to release the data to the public and a part of researchers' responsibility for dissimulation. Negative results of the experiments on animals have should be public knowledge. Releasing negative results to other researchers could give them more on the information about which experiments that are not worth pursuing, shine a light on unfortunate research designs, and can help reduce the number of animals used in research.
9. Requirement of expertise on animals: Researchers and other parties who work and handle live animals are required to have adequate and updated documentation expertise on all animals. This includes knowledge about the biology of the animal species in question, and willingly be able to take care of the animals properly.
10. Requirement of due care: There are many laws, rules, international convention, and agreements regarding the laboratory animals that both the researchers and the research managers have to comply with. Anyone who wants to use animals in experiments should familiarize themselves with the current rules.

== Ethical theories ==
Ethical thinking has influenced the way society perceives animal ethics in at least three ways. Firstly, the original rise of animal ethics and how animals should be treated. Secondly, the evolution of animal ethics as people started to realise that this ideology was not as simple as was first proposed. The third way, is through the challenges humans face contemplating these ethics; consistency of morals, and the justification of some cases.

=== Consequentialism ===
Consequentialism is a collection of ethical theories which judge the rightness or wrongness of an action on its consequences; if the actions brings more benefit than harm, it is good, if it brings more harm than benefit, it is bad. The most well-known type of consequentialism theory is utilitarianism.

The publication of Peter Singer's book Animal Liberation, in 1975, gathered sizeable traction and provided him with a platform to speak his mind on the issues of animal rights. Due to the attention Singer received, his views were the most accessible, and therefore best known by the public. He supported the theory of utilitarianism, which is still a controversial but highly regarded foundation for animal research. The theory of utilitarianism states that "an action is right if and only if it produces a better balance of benefits and harms than available alternative actions", thus, this theory determines whether or not something is right by weighing the pleasure against the suffering of the result. It is not concerned with the process, only the weight of the consequence against the process, and while the consequentialism theory suggests if an action is bad or good, utilitarianism only focuses on the benefit of the outcome. While this may be able to be applied to some animal research and raising for food, several objections have been raised against utilitarianism. Singer made his decision to support utilitarianism on the basis of sentience, selecting that aspect as the differential factor between human and animals; the ability of self-consciousness, autonomy and to act morally. This ended up being called "The argument from marginal cases". However, critics allege that not all morally relevant beings fall under this category, for instance, some people with in a persistent vegetative state who have no awareness of themselves or their surroundings. Based on Singer's arguments, it would be as (or more) justified to carry out experiments in medical research on these non-sentient humans than on other (sentient) animals. Another limitation of applying utilitarianism to animal ethics is that it is difficult to accurately measure and compare the suffering of the harmed animals to the gains of the beneficiaries, for instance, in medical experiments.

Jeff Sebo argues that utilitarianism has three main implications for animal ethics: "First, utilitarianism plausibly implies that all vertebrates and at least some invertebrates morally matter, and that large animals like elephants matter more on average and that small animals like ants might matter more in total. Second, utilitarianism plausibly implies that we morally ought to attempt to both promote animal welfare and respect animal rights in many real-life cases. Third, utilitarianism plausibly implies that we should prioritize farmed and wild animal welfare and pursue a variety of interventions at once to make progress on these issues".

=== Deontology ===
Deontology is a theory that evaluates moral actions based only on doing one's duty, not on the consequences of the actions. This means that if it is your duty to carry out a task, it is morally right regardless of the consequences, and if you fail to do your duty, you are morally wrong. There are many types of deontological theories, however, the one most commonly recognised is often associated with Immanuel Kant. This ethical theory can be implemented from conflicting sides, for example, a researcher may think it is their duty to make an animal suffer to find a cure for a disease that is affecting millions of humans, which according to deontology is morally correct. On the other hand, an animal activist might think that saving these animals being tested on is their duty, creating a contradiction in this idea. Furthermore, another conflicting nature of this theory is when you must choose between two imposing moral duties, such as deciding if you should lie about where an escaped chicken went, or if you should tell the truth and send the chicken to its death. Lying is an immoral duty to carry out, however, so is sending a chicken to its death.

A highlighted flaw in Kant's theory is that it was not applicable to non-human animals, only specifically to humans. This theory opposes utilitarianism in the sense that instead of concerning itself with the consequence, it focuses on the duty. However, both are fundamental theories that contribute to animal ethics.

=== Virtue ethics ===
Virtue ethics does not pinpoint on either the consequences or duty of the action, but from the act of behaving like a virtuous person. Thus, asking if such actions would stem from a virtuous person or someone with a vicious nature. If it would stem from someone virtuous, it is said that it is morally right, and if from a vicious person, immoral behaviour. A virtuous person is said to hold qualities such as respect, tolerance, justice and equality. One advantage that this theory has over the others, is that it takes into account human emotions, affecting the moral decision, which was absent in the previous two. However, a flaw is that people's opinions of a virtuous person are very subjective, and thus, can drastically affect the person's moral compass. With this underlying issue, this ethical theory cannot be applied to all cases.

== Relationship with environmental ethics ==
Differing conceptions of the treatment of and duties towards animals, particularly those living in the wild, within animal ethics and environmental ethics have been a source of conflict between the two ethical positions; some philosophers have made a case that the two positions are incompatible, while others have argued that such disagreements can be overcome.

== See also ==
- Abolitionism (animal rights)
- Animal Ethics (organization)
- Ethics of eating meat
- Ethics of uncertain sentience
- Suffering
- Reverence for Life
