= Bibliography of wild animal suffering =

Publications on suffering and welfare in wild animals

This bibliography of wild animal suffering lists publications on suffering and welfare among free-living animals. It includes works on the causes and extent of suffering, its ethical significance, welfare biology, and arguments for and against human intervention to assist wild animals.

== Bibliographies and reference lists ==
- Stafforini, Pablo (2013-06-06). "Wild animal welfare: a bibliography". Pablo's miscellany.
- Dorado, Daniel (2015-11-02). "Ethical Interventions in the Wild. An Annotated Bibliography". Relations. Beyond Anthropocentrism. 3 (2) 8: 219–238. doi:10.7358/rela-2015-002-dora. ISSN 2280-9643.
- "Publications about wild animal suffering". Animal Ethics. 2018-04-30.
- "The situation of animals in the wild bibliography". Animal Ethics. 2018-08-02.
- "Helping animals in the wild bibliography". Animal Ethics. 2018-08-05.

== Books and chapters ==
- Hume, David (1779). Dialogues Concerning Natural Religion (2nd ed.). London. p. 176.
- Buffon, Georges Louis Leclerc (1807). Natural History: Containing a Theory of the Earth, a General History of Man, of the Brute Creation, and of Vegetables, Minerals, &c. &c. &c. London: H. D. Symonds.
- Gompertz, Lewis (1852). Fragments in Defence of Animals, and Essays on Morals, Soul, and Future State. London: W. Horsell. p. 18.
- Mill, John Stuart (1874). "Nature". Three Essays on Religion. London: Longmans, Green, Reader, and Dyer. pp. 28, 32, 65.
- Paley, William (1879) [1802]. Paxton, James; Ware, John (eds.). Natural Theology or Evidences of the Existence and Attributes of the Deity. New York: Sheldon & Company.
- Salt, Henry Stephens; Leffingwell, Albert (1894). "The Case of Wild Animals". Animals' Rights: Considered in Relation to Social Progress. New York, London: Macmillan & Co. pp. 36–42.
- Moore, J. Howard (1899). Better-World Philosophy: A Sociological Synthesis. Chicago: The Ward Waugh Company.
- Moore, J. Howard (1906). The Universal Kinship. Chicago: Charles H. Kerr & Co. pp. 249–250.
- Moore, J. Howard (1912). Ethics and Education. London: G. Bell & Sons.
- Hornaday, William T. (1913). Our Vanishing Wild Life: Its Extermination and Preservation. New York: New York Zoological Society.
- Hornaday, William T. (1922). The Minds and Manners of Wild Animals: A Book of Personal Observations. New York: Charles Scribner's Sons.
- Simpson, Keith (1979). Schultz, Martin (ed.). The Mysteries of Life & Death: An Illustrated Investigation into the Incredible World of Death. London: Salamander Books. p. 22. ISBN 978-0-86101-036-3.
- Sapontzis, Steve F. (1987). Morals, Reason, and Animals. Temple University Press. ISBN 978-0-87722-493-8.
- Rolston III, Holmes (1988). Environmental Ethics: Duties To and Values in the Natural World. Philadelphia: Temple University Press. ISBN 978-0-87722-501-0.
- Gompertz, Lewis (1992) [1824]. Singer, Peter (ed.). Moral Inquiries on the Situation of Man and of Brutes. Fontwell: Centaur Press.
- Darwin, Charles (September 1993). Barlow, Nora (ed.). The Autobiography of Charles Darwin: 1809–1882. W. W. Norton & Company. ISBN 978-0-393-31069-6.
- Dawkins, Richard (1995). River Out of Eden: A Darwinian View of Life. London: Orion Publishing Group. ISBN 978-0-297-81540-2.
- Rinpoche, Patrul (1998). The Words of My Perfect Teacher (Revised ed.). Shambhala. pp. 76–77. ISBN 978-1-57062-412-4.
- Mayerfeld, Jamie (1999). Suffering and Moral Responsibility. New York: Oxford University Press. p. 117. ISBN 978-0-19-515495-5.
- Schopenhauer, Arthur (2000). Parerga and Paralipomena: Short Philosophical Essays. Oxford: Clarendon Press. p. 292. ISBN 978-0-19-924221-4.
- Belshaw, Christopher (2001). Environmental Philosophy. McGill-Queen's Press. p. xii. ISBN 978-1-902683-21-8.
- Leonardo da Vinci (2004-01-01). The Notebooks of Leonardo Da Vinci — Complete. Translated by Richter, Jean Paul. folio 1219.
- Cooper, David E.; James, Simon P. (2005). Buddhism, Virtue and Environment. Farnham: Ashgate Publishing. pp. 119–120. ISBN 978-1-351-95431-0.
- Næss, Arne (2005). "Should We Try to Relieve Clear Cases of Suffering in Nature?" (PDF). In Drengson, Alan (ed.). The Selected Works of Arne Naess. Dordrecht: Springer Netherlands. pp. 2391–2400. doi:10.1007/978-1-4020-4519-6_99. ISBN 978-1-4020-4519-6.
- Nussbaum, Martha C. (2006). Frontiers of Justice: Disability, Nationality, Species Membership. Cambridge, Massachusetts: Harvard University Press. ISBN 978-0-674-04157-8. OCLC 434003841.
- Minelli, Alessandro (2008). "Predation". In Jørgensen, Sven Erik; Fath, Brian D. (eds.). Encyclopedia of Ecology. Elsevier. ISBN 978-0-08-093116-6. OCLC 527382954.
- Murray, Michael J. (2008). Nature Red in Tooth and Claw: Theism and the Problem of Animal Suffering. Oxford University Press. ISBN 978-0-19-923727-2. OCLC 209815655.
- Palmer, Clare (2010). Animal Ethics in Context. Columbia University Press. ISBN 978-0-231-12904-6.
- Donaldson, Sue; Kymlicka, Will (2011). Zoopolis: A Political Theory of Animal Rights. Oxford University Press. ISBN 978-0-19-959966-0.
- Leopardi, Giacomo (2013). "4511". Zibaldone: The Notebooks of Leopardi. Penguin. ISBN 978-0-14-196200-9.
- Nelson, Michael P.; Vucetich, John A. (2013-02-01), "Wilderness, Value of" (PDF), in Lafollette, Hugh (ed.), International Encyclopedia of Ethics, Oxford, UK: Blackwell Publishing Ltd, doi:10.1002/9781444367072.wbiee645, ISBN 978-1-4051-8641-4
- Botzler, Richard G.; Brown, Richard N. (2014). Foundations of Wildlife Diseases. Berkeley, California: University of California Press. p. 378. ISBN 978-0-520-27609-3.
- de Lazari-Radek, Katarzyna; Singer, Peter (2014). The Point of View of the Universe: Sidgwick and Contemporary Ethics. Oxford: Oxford University Press. p. 346. ISBN 978-0-19-960369-5.
- McMahan, Jeff (2015). "The Moral Problem of Predation" (PDF). In Chignell, Andrew; Cuneo, Terence; Halteman, Matt (eds.). Philosophy Comes to Dinner: Arguments About the Ethics of Eating. London: Routledge. ISBN 978-0-415-80683-1. Archived from the original (PDF) on 2020-11-11.
- Comstock, Gary (2016). "Two Views of Animals in Environmental Ethics" (PDF). In Borchert, Donald M. (ed.). Philosophy: Environmental Ethics. Farmington Hills, Michigan: Gale. pp. 151–183.
- Reese, Jacy (2018). "The Expanding Moral Circle, Revisited". The End of Animal Farming: How Scientists, Entrepreneurs, and Activists Are Building an Animal-Free Food System. Beacon Press. ISBN 978-0-8070-1945-0.
- Cochrane, Alasdair (2018-10-18). Sentientist Politics. Vol. 1. Oxford University Press. doi:10.1093/oso/9780198789802.001.0001. ISBN 978-0-19-878980-2.
- Knight, Kelli; Wick, Peach van (2019). "Medical and Surgical Management of Deer and Relatives". Medical Management of Wildlife Species. John Wiley & Sons, Ltd. pp. 259–270. doi:10.1002/9781119036708.ch20. ISBN 978-1-119-03670-8. S2CID 208578632.
- Trindade, Gabriel Garmendia da (2020). Trindade, Gabriel Garmendia da; Woodhall, Andrew (eds.). Intervention or Protest: Acting for Nonhuman Animals. Vernon Press. p. 244. ISBN 978-1-62273-975-2.
- Schneider, John R. (2020). "Facing the Darwinian Problem of Evil". Animal Suffering and the Darwinian Problem of Evil (1 ed.). Cambridge University Press. pp. 15–47. doi:10.1017/9781108767439.003. ISBN 978-1-108-76743-9. S2CID 238121342.
- Johannsen, Kyle (2020). Wild Animal Ethics: The Moral and Political Problem of Wild Animal Suffering. Routledge.
- Duclos, Joshua S. (2022). Wilderness, Morality, and Value. Lanham: Lexington Books. ISBN 978-1-6669-0136-8. OCLC 1330426290.
- Cunha, Luciano Carlos (2022). Razões Para Ajudar: O Sofrimento dos Animais Selvagens e Suas Implicações Éticas (in Portuguese) (1st ed.). Appris Editora. ISBN 978-65-250-2636-7.
- Faria, Catia (2022). Animal Ethics in the Wild. Cambridge University Press. ISBN 978-1-00-910063-2.
- Horta, Oscar (2022-06-23). Making a Stand for Animals. London: Routledge. doi:10.4324/9781003285922. ISBN 978-1-003-28592-2.
- Faria, Catia (2024-05-02). "Wild Animal Ethics". The Routledge Companion to Gender and Animals. London: Routledge. pp. 255–263. doi:10.4324/9781003273400-19. ISBN 978-1-003-27340-0.
- Johannsen, Kyle, ed. (2025). Positive Duties to Wild Animals. London: Routledge. ISBN 978-1-03-289818-6.
- Cunha, Luciano Carlos (2025). A ética e a situação dos animais selvagens: uma análise da questão dos danos naturais (PDF) (in Portuguese). Vol. 1 (1st ed.). Florianópolis: Senciência e Ética. ISBN 978-65-01-49140-0.

== Essays ==
- Olivier, David (1993-06-01). "Pourquoi je ne suis pas écologiste" [Why I am not an environmentalist]. Les Cahiers antispécistes (in French).
- McMahan, Jeff (2010-09-19). "The Meat Eaters". Opinionator. New York Times.
- McMahan, Jeff (2010-09-28). "Predators: A Response". Opinionator. The New York Times.
- Wilcox, Christie (2011-12-04). "Bambi or Bessie: Are wild animals happier?". Scientific American.
- Horta, Oscar (2015-01-05). "Why the Situation of Animals in the Wild Should Concern Us". Animal Charity Evaluators.
- Reese, Jacy (2015-12-14). "Wild animals endure illness, injury, and starvation. We should help". Vox.
- Nadler, Steven (2018-08-10). "We have an ethical obligation to relieve individual animal suffering". Aeon.
- Sebo, Jeff (2020-01-15). "All we owe to animals". Aeon.
- Monbiot, George (2020-02-19). "I shot a deer – and I still believe it was the ethical thing to do". The Guardian. ISSN 0261-3077.
- Tomasik, Brian (2020-05-24) [July 2009]. "The Importance of Wild-Animal Suffering". Center on Long-Term Risk.

== Journal articles and academic papers ==
- Herder, Johann Gottfried (1801). "The Animal Kingdom: In Relation to the History of Man". The Union Magazine, and Imperial Register. 2: 172.
- Evans, Edward Payson (September 1894). "Ethical Relations Between Man and Beast". Popular Science Monthly. 45: 646.
- Fiske, W. F. (1910-02-01). "Superparasitism: an Important Factor in the Natural Control of Insects". Journal of Economic Entomology. 3 (1): 88–97. doi:10.1093/jee/3.1.88. ISSN 0022-0493.
- Smith, Allen G.; Webster, Harry R. (1955). "Effects of Hail Storms on Waterfowl Populations in Alberta, Canada: 1953". The Journal of Wildlife Management. 19 (3): 368–374. doi:10.2307/3797388. ISSN 0022-541X. JSTOR 3797388.
- Clark, Stephen R. L. (1979). "The Rights of Wild Things". Inquiry. 22 (1–4): 171–188. doi:10.1080/00201747908601871.
- Callicott, J. Baird (1980-11-01). "Animal Liberation: A Triangular Affair" (PDF). Environmental Ethics. doi:10.5840/enviroethics19802424. Archived from the original (PDF) on 2016-05-09.
- Sagoff, Mark (1984). "Animal Liberation and Environmental Ethics: Bad Marriage, Quick Divorce". Osgoode Hall Law Journal. 22 (2): 297–307. doi:10.60082/2817-5069.1936.
- Sapontzis, Steve F. (1984). "Predation". Ethics and Animals. 5 (2): 27–38. doi:10.15368/ea.1984v5n2.1.
- Scott, Marilyn E. (1988). "The Impact of Infection and Disease on Animal Populations: Implications for Conservation Biology". Conservation Biology. 2 (1): 40–56. doi:10.1111/j.1523-1739.1988.tb00334.x. ISSN 1523-1739.
- Hettinger, Ned (1994). "Valuing Predation in Rolston's Environmental Ethics" (PDF). Environmental Ethics. 16 (1): 3–20. doi:10.5840/enviroethics199416138. S2CID 18428255. Archived from the original (PDF) on 2019-02-25.
- Ng, Yew-Kwang (1995). "Towards welfare biology: Evolutionary economics of animal consciousness and suffering". Biology and Philosophy. 10 (3): 255–285. doi:10.1007/BF00852469.
- Kirkwood, J. K.; Sainsbury, A. W. (August 1996). "Ethics of Interventions for the Welfare of Free-Living Wild Animals". Animal Welfare. 5 (3): 235–243. doi:10.1017/S0962728600018820.
- Moriarty, Paul; Mark Woods (1997). "Hunting ≠ Predation". Environmental Ethics. 19 (4): 391–404. doi:10.5840/enviroethics19971945.
- Everett, Jennifer (2001). "Environmental Ethics, Animal Welfarism, and the Problem of Predation: A Bambi Lover's Respect for Nature". Ethics & the Environment. 6 (1): 42–67. ISSN 1085-6633. JSTOR 40339003.
- Calvete, C.; Estrada, R.; Villafuerte, R.; Osácar, J. J.; Lucientes, J. (2002). "Epidemiology of viral haemorrhagic disease and myxomatosis in a free-living population of wild rabbits". Veterinary Record. 150 (25): 776–782. doi:10.1136/vr.150.25.776. ISSN 2042-7670. PMID 12135072. S2CID 7084943.
- Cowen, Tyler (2003). "Policing Nature" (PDF). Environmental Ethics. 25 (2): 169–182. doi:10.5840/enviroethics200325231. S2CID 16279915. Archived from the original (PDF) on 2019-10-29.
- Rödel, H. G.; Bora, A.; Kaetzke, P.; Khaschei, M.; Hutzelmeyer, H.; von Holst, D. (August 2004). "Over-winter survival in subadult European rabbits: weather effects, density dependence, and the impact of individual characteristics". Oecologia. 140 (4): 566–576. doi:10.1007/s00442-004-1616-1. ISSN 0029-8549. PMID 15309616. S2CID 40720075.
- Harris, J. B.; Goonetilleke, A. (2004-09-01). "Animal poisons and the nervous system: what the neurologist needs to know". Journal of Neurology, Neurosurgery & Psychiatry. 75 (suppl 3): iii40–iii46. doi:10.1136/jnnp.2004.045724. PMC 1765666. PMID 15316044.
- Matheny, Gaverick; Chan, Kai M. A. (December 2005). "Human Diets and Animal Welfare: the Illogic of the Larder". Journal of Agricultural and Environmental Ethics. 18 (6): 579–594. doi:10.1007/s10806-005-1805-x. ISSN 1187-7863. S2CID 154198751.
- James, Simon P. (2006-02-01). "Buddhism and the Ethics of Species Conservation". Environmental Values. 15 (1): 85–97. doi:10.3197/096327106776678942.
- Morris, Michael C.; Thornhill, Richard H. (2006-01-01). "Animal Liberationist Responses to Non-Anthropogenic Animal Suffering" (PDF). Worldviews: Global Religions, Culture, and Ecology. 10 (3): 355–379. doi:10.1163/156853506778942077. ISSN 1363-5247.
- Hadley, John (2006). "The Duty to Aid Nonhuman Animals in Dire Need". Journal of Applied Philosophy. 23 (4): 445–451. doi:10.1111/j.1468-5930.2006.00358.x.
- Raterman, Ty (Winter 2008). "An Environmentalist's Lament on Predation" (PDF). Environmental Ethics. 30 (4): 417–434. doi:10.5840/enviroethics200830443.
- Beldomenico, Pablo M; Telfer, Sandra; Gebert, Stephanie; Lukomski, Lukasz; Bennett, Malcolm; Begon, Michael (2008-08-07). "Poor condition and infection: a vicious circle in natural populations". Proceedings of the Royal Society B: Biological Sciences. 275 (1644): 1753–1759. doi:10.1098/rspb.2008.0147. ISSN 0962-8452. PMC 2453294. PMID 18448414.
- Gregory, T. Ryan (December 2009). "The Argument from Design: A Guided Tour of William Paley's Natural Theology (1802)". Evolution: Education and Outreach. 2 (4): 602–611. doi:10.1007/s12052-009-0184-6. ISSN 1936-6434.
- Kemmerer, Lisa (April 2009). "Hindu Ethics and Nonhuman Animals". Swadharam Journal. 3: 32–45.
- Pedatella, Stefan (2009-03-01). "Images of Animal Predation in Giacomo Leopardi's Dialogo della Natura e di un Islandese". Italian Culture. 27 (1): 25–42. doi:10.1179/155909009X401665. ISSN 0161-4622. S2CID 159793645.
- Simmons, Aaron (2009). "Animals, Predators, The Right to Life and The Duty to Save Lives". Ethics & the Environment. 14 (1): 15–27. doi:10.2979/ete.2009.14.1.15. S2CID 89542818.
- Aaltola, Elisa (February 2010). "Animal Ethics and the Argument from Absurdity". Environmental Values. 19 (1): 79–98. doi:10.3197/096327110X485392. S2CID 144779771.
- Robar, Nicholas; Burness, Gary; Murray, Dennis L. (2010). "Tropics, trophics and taxonomy: the determinants of parasite-associated host mortality". Oikos. 119 (8): 1273–1280. doi:10.1111/j.1600-0706.2009.18292.x. ISSN 1600-0706.
- Horta, Oscar (2010). "Debunking the Idyllic View of Natural Processes: Population Dynamics and Suffering in the Wild". Télos. 17 (1): 73–88.
- Goodman, Brett A.; Johnson, Pieter T. J. (2011-05-25). "Disease and the Extended Phenotype: Parasites Control Host Performance and Survival through Induced Changes in Body Plan". PLOS ONE. 6 (5) e20193. doi:10.1371/journal.pone.0020193. PMC 3102088. PMID 21633498.
- Weidman, T.; Litvaitis, J. A. (2011-07-01). "Can supplemental food increase winter survival of a threatened cottontail rabbit?". Biological Conservation. 144 (7): 2054–2058. doi:10.1016/j.biocon.2011.04.027. ISSN 0006-3207.
- Ebert, Rainer; Machan, Tibor R. (2012). "Innocent Threats and the Moral Problem of Carnivorous Animals". Journal of Applied Philosophy. 29 (2): 146–159. doi:10.1111/j.1468-5930.2012.00561.x.
- Sözmen, Beril İdemen (2013). "Harm in the Wild: Facing Non-Human Suffering in Nature". Ethical Theory and Moral Practice. 16 (5): 1075–1088. doi:10.1007/s10677-013-9416-5.
- China, Victor; Holzman, Roi (2014-06-03). "Hydrodynamic starvation in first-feeding larval fishes". Proceedings of the National Academy of Sciences. 111 (22): 8083–8088. doi:10.1073/pnas.1323205111. PMC 4050599. PMID 24843180.
- Zuiddam, Benno (July 2014). "2nd Century Church Fathers: God will make lions vegetarian again". Creation. 36 (3): 46–47.
- Faria, Catia (May 2015). "Making a Difference on Behalf of Animals Living in the Wild: Interview with Jeff McMahan" (PDF). Relations. 3 (1) 5: 81–84. doi:10.7358/rela-2015-001-fari. ISSN 2283-3196.
- Faria, Catia; Paez, Eze (2015-05-11). "Animals in Need: the Problem of Wild Animal Suffering and Intervention in Nature". Relations. Beyond Anthropocentrism. 3 (1): 7–13. ISSN 2280-9643.
- Paez, Eze (2015-11-02). "Refusing Help and Inflicting Harm. A Critique of the Environmentalist View". Relations. Beyond Anthropocentrism. 3 (2) 3: 165–178. doi:10.7358/rela-2015-002-paez. ISSN 2280-9643.
- Horta, Oscar (2015). "The Problem of Evil in Nature: Evolutionary Bases of the Prevalence of Disvalue". Relations. Beyond Anthropocentrism. 3 (1): 17–32. doi:10.7358/rela-2015-001-hort.
- Tomasik, Brian (2015). "The Importance of Wild-Animal Suffering". Relations. Beyond Anthropocentrism. 3 (2): 133–152. doi:10.7358/rela-2015-002-toma.
- Palmer, Clare (2015). "Against the View That We Are Normally Required to Assist Wild Animals". Relations. Beyond Anthropocentrism. 3 (2): 203–210. doi:10.7358/rela-2015-002-palm.
- Faria, Catia (2015). "Disentangling Obligations of Assistance. A Reply to Clare Palmer's "Against the View That We Are Usually Required to Assist Wild Animals"". Relations. Beyond Anthropocentrism. 3 (2): 211–218. doi:10.7358/rela-2015-002-fari.
- Moen, Ole Martin (2016-05-09). "The ethics of wild animal suffering". Etikk I Praksis - Nordic Journal of Applied Ethics. 10 (1): 91–104. doi:10.5324/eip.v10i1.1972. ISSN 1890-4009.
- Keulartz, Jozef (2016-10-01). "Should the Lion Eat Straw Like the Ox? Animal Ethics and the Predation Problem". Journal of Agricultural and Environmental Ethics. 29 (5): 813–834. doi:10.1007/s10806-016-9637-4. hdl:2066/161423.
- Horta, Oscar (2016). "Changing attitudes towards animals in the wild and speciesism". Animal Sentience. 1 (7) 15. doi:10.51291/2377-7478.1109.
- Delon, Nicolas; Purves, Duncan (2018-04-01). "Wild Animal Suffering is Intractable". Journal of Agricultural and Environmental Ethics. 31 (2): 239–260. doi:10.1007/s10806-018-9722-y. S2CID 158886418.
- Libersat, Frederic; Kaiser, Maayan; Emanuel, Stav (2018). "Mind Control: How Parasites Manipulate Cognitive Functions in Their Insect Hosts". Frontiers in Psychology. 9 572. doi:10.3389/fpsyg.2018.00572. ISSN 1664-1078. PMC 5938628. PMID 29765342.
- McShane, Katie (2018). "Why Animal Welfare Is Not Biodiversity, Ecosystem Services, or Human Welfare: Toward a More Complete Assessment of Climate Impacts" (PDF). Les ateliers de l'éthique / The Ethics Forum. 13 (1): 43–64. doi:10.7202/1055117ar. ISSN 1718-9977.
- Groff, Zach; Ng, Yew-Kwang (2019-06-18). "Does suffering dominate enjoyment in the animal kingdom? An update to welfare biology". Biology & Philosophy. 34 (4): 40. doi:10.1007/s10539-019-9692-0. ISSN 1572-8404. S2CID 196683974.
- Hopster, Jeroen (2019-12-01). "The Speciesism Debate: Intuition, Method, and Empirical Advances". Animals. 9 (12): 1054. doi:10.3390/ani9121054. PMC 6940905. PMID 31805715.
- Zanette, Liana Y.; Clinchy, Michael (2019-05-06). "Ecology of fear". Current Biology. 29 (9): R309–R313. doi:10.1016/j.cub.2019.02.042. PMID 31063718. S2CID 145049061.
- Zanette, Liana Y.; Hobbs, Emma C.; Witterick, Lauren E.; MacDougall-Shackleton, Scott A.; Clinchy, Michael (2019-08-07). "Predator-induced fear causes PTSD-like changes in the brains and behaviour of wild animals". Scientific Reports. 9 (1): 11474. doi:10.1038/s41598-019-47684-6. PMC 6685979. PMID 31391473.
- Bruers, Stijn (2020-10-22). "Speciesism, Arbitrariness and Moral Illusions". Philosophia. 49 (3): 957–975. doi:10.1007/s11406-020-00282-7. ISSN 0048-3893. S2CID 226346638.
- Povinelli, Daniel J. (2020-11-01). "Can Comparative Psychology Crack its Toughest Nut?" (PDF). Animal Behavior and Cognition. 7 (4): 589–652. doi:10.26451/abc.07.04.09.2020.
- Paez, Eze (2020-01-01). "Preserving nature for the benefit of all sentient individuals". Animal Sentience. 4 (27). doi:10.51291/2377-7478.1551. hdl:10230/57029. ISSN 2377-7478.
- Gutiérrez, Jara; De Miguel, Javier (2021-06-26). "Fires in nature: a review of the challenges for wild animals". European Journal of Ecology. 7 (1). doi:10.17161/eurojecol.v7i1.14643. ISSN 1339-8474.
- Soryl, Asher A.; Moore, Andrew J.; Seddon, Philip J.; King, Mike R. (2021). "The Case for Welfare Biology". Journal of Agricultural and Environmental Ethics. 34 7. doi:10.1007/s10806-021-09855-2.
- Hecht, Luke (2021). "The importance of considering age when quantifying wild animals' welfare". Biological Reviews. 96 (6): 2602–2616. doi:10.1111/brv.12769.
- Walker, Jack (June 2022). "Born to be Wild? On 'Wildness' Objections to Preventing Wild Animal Suffering" (PDF). Aporia. 32 (1).
- Browning, Heather; Veit, Walter (2023). "Positive Wild Animal Welfare". Biology & Philosophy. 38 14. doi:10.1007/s10539-023-09901-5. hdl:1983/e496110b-2ea4-40d9-b70f-44bccc5efbb1.
- Beaulieu, Michaël (2024). "Capturing wild animal welfare: a physiological perspective". Biological Reviews. 99 (1): 1–22. doi:10.1111/brv.13009.
- Eckerström Liedholm, Simon; Hecht, Luke; Elliott, Vittoria (2024). "Improving wild animal welfare through contraception". BioScience. 74 (10): 695–700. doi:10.1093/biosci/biae071.
- Beaulieu, Michaël; Masilkova, Michaela (2024). "Plugging biologging into animal welfare: An opportunity for advancing wild animal welfare science". Methods in Ecology and Evolution. 15 (12): 2172–2188. doi:10.1111/2041-210X.14441.
- York, Kyle (2024). "Optimism about Wild Fish Welfare". Journal of Agricultural and Environmental Ethics. 37 16. doi:10.1007/s10806-024-09937-x.
- Sandler, Ronald; Palmer, Clare (2025). "The emerging movement against wild animal suffering and its potential implications for conservation". Oryx. 59 (4): 532–541. doi:10.1017/S003060532510152X.
- Katz, Tristan (2026). "Wild Animal Suffering Is Not Intractable: A Precautionary Approach to Compassionate Intervention". Journal of Applied Philosophy. 43 (2): 471–490. doi:10.1002/japp.70069.
- Elliott, Vittoria; Beausoleil, Ngaio; Browning, Heather; et al. (October 2026). "The emerging field of wild animal welfare science". Trends in Ecology & Evolution. 41 (10): 912–923. doi:10.1016/j.tree.2026.06.003. PMID 42362420.

== Theses and dissertations ==
- Faria, Catia (2016). Animal Ethics Goes Wild: The Problem of Wild Animal Suffering and Intervention in Nature (PDF) (PhD thesis). Universitat Pompeu Fabra.
- Duclos, Joshua (2018). Value, morality, and wilderness (Thesis). Boston University.
- Cunha, Luciano Carlos (2018). Vítimas da natureza: implicações éticas dos danos que os animais não humanos padecem em decorrência dos processos naturais (PDF) (PhD thesis) (in Portuguese). Universidade Federal de Santa Catarina.
- Genovez, Arthur Ghiraldini (2023). Ética, biologia do bem-estar e as razões para se prevenir o sofrimento dos animais selvagens (PDF) (Thesis) (in Portuguese). Universidade Federal de Santa Catarina.
- Rodrigues, Ivo Luciano da Assunção (2025). O sofrimento dos animais selvagens: pensando em soluções (PDF) (PhD thesis) (in Portuguese). Universidade Federal de Pelotas.

== News and magazine articles ==
- Sanderson, Katharine (2007-01-04). "Hot waters make it hard for fish to breathe". Nature: news070101–5. doi:10.1038/news070101-5. ISSN 0028-0836. S2CID 129050854.
- Sekar, Sandhya (2015-05-22). "Parasitoid wasps may be the most diverse animal group". BBC Earth.
- Bonnardel, Yves (2016-08-22). "Yves Bonnardel: l'antispéciste qui n'aimait pas la nature" [Yves Bonnardel: The Anti-Speciesist Who Didn't Like Nature]. Usbek&Rica (in French).
- Ruiz Carreras, María (2016-11-04). "'La lucha por la igualdad y la justicia es necesariamente feminista y antiespecista'" [The fight for equality and justice is necessarily feminist and antispeciesist]. Diagonal (in Spanish).
- Ray, Georgia (2017-06-29). "How Many Wild Animals Are There?". Wild-Animal Suffering Research. Archived from the original on 2021-04-13.
- Robbins, Jim (2017-04-11). "The Fear Factor: How the Peril of Predators Can Transform a Landscape". Yale E360.
- Muraille, Eric (2018-07-23). "Debate: Could anti-speciesism and veganism form the basis for a rational society?". The Conversation.
- Elbaum, Rachel; Eckardt, Andy (2018-08-16). "Wildlife, animals suffer in Europe's summer of extreme heat". NBC News.
- Amos, Jonathan (2019-04-24). "Antarctica: Thousands of emperor penguin chicks wiped out". BBC News.
- Sharman, Jon (2019-08-20). "Thousands of birds killed after freak weather event leaves them with smashed skulls and internal damage". The Independent.
- Robbins, Jim (2020-03-19). "With Temperatures Rising, Can Animals Survive the Heat Stress?". Yale E360.
- Zhang, Sarah (2020-05-26). "America's Never-Ending Battle Against Flesh-Eating Worms". The Atlantic. Archived from the original on 2025-03-07.
- Olvera, Lola (2020-03-25). "When Natural Disaster Strikes, Wildlife Pays A Heavy Price". Sentient Media.
- Canon, Gabrielle (2021-09-10). "How a Tahoe refuge saved owls, coyotes and raccoons from wildfire". The Guardian.
- Matthews, Dylan (2021-04-12). "The wild frontier of animal welfare". Vox.
- Klein, Alice (2022-09-19). "There are 20,000,000,000,000,000 ants crawling all over Earth". New Scientist.
- Verchot, Manon. "Meet the people who want to turn predators into herbivores". Treehugger.

== Online resources ==
- "Antagonism in nature: Interspecific conflict". Animal Ethics.
- "Antagonism in nature: Intraspecific fights". Animal Ethics.
- "Malnutrition and Starvation". Michigan Department of Natural Resources.
- "Malnutrition, hunger and thirst in wild animals". Animal Ethics.
- "Parasitoids". Cornell University College of Agriculture and Life Sciences.
- "Physical injuries in wild animals". Animal Ethics.
- "Predators, parasites and parasitoids". The Australian Museum.
- "Weather conditions and nonhuman animals". Animal Ethics.
- "Wild Animal Suffering — The scale, the problem, and why it matters". wildanimalsuffering.org.
- "Why wild animal suffering matters". Animal Ethics.
- "Sofrimento dos animais selvagens". Senciência e Ética (in Portuguese).
- Shooster, Jay (2017-07-11). "Legal Personhood and the Positive Rights of Wild Animals". Wild-Animal Suffering Research. Archived from the original on 2020-12-04.
- Ray, Georgia (2017-11-22). "Parasite Load and Disease in Wild Animals". Wild-Animal Suffering Research. Archived from the original on 2021-06-12.

== Primary documents and correspondence ==
- Darwin, Charles (1860-05-22). "To Asa Gray". Letter to Asa Gray.
