= Animal Ethics in the Wild =

2022 book by Catia Faria

- First edition cover
- Author: Catia Faria
- Language: English
- Subjects: Wild animal ethics; wild animal suffering
- Publisher: Cambridge University Press
- Publication date: 22 September 2022
- Publication place: United Kingdom
- Media type: Print (hardback and paperback)
- Pages: 222
- ISBN: 978-1-00-910063-2
- OCLC: 1370190258

Animal Ethics in the Wild: Wild Animal Suffering and Intervention in Nature is a 2022 book by the Portuguese philosopher Catia Faria, published by Cambridge University Press. The book examines wild animal suffering as an ethical problem and argues that humans can have moral reasons to assist wild animals when doing so is expected to reduce suffering without causing greater harm.

Faria discusses debates in animal ethics and environmental ethics, including arguments for and against intervention in nature. The book considers objections based on perversity, futility, and jeopardy, and discusses the moral relevance of speciesism, sentience, and well-being. Reviewers discussed the book in relation to wild animal sentience, moral considerability, environmental ethics, and the practical implications of intervention.

== Publication history ==
Animal Ethics in the Wild was first published by Cambridge University Press in hardback and paperback on 22 September 2022. An ebook version was published on 18 January 2023.

== Summary ==
Animal Ethics in the Wild discusses wild animal suffering and argues that humans can have obligations to reduce it. Faria begins from two claims: that suffering is bad, and that humans should prevent or reduce suffering when this can be done without causing greater harm or threatening other values. The first chapter argues that non-human animals, including wild animals, are morally considerable because they are sentient and have well-being. The book also argues that, if death is bad for humans, it can also be bad for non-human animals.

The book addresses objections to intervening in nature. These include perversity and futility objections, which hold that intervention could make conditions worse or that attempts to help wild animals are likely to fail. Faria rejects these objections when intervention is expected to have a positive effect for wild animals. The book also discusses speciesism, rejects anthropocentrism as a defence of speciesism, and criticises accounts of moral considerability that exclude wild animals from positive obligations.

Faria also discusses the prevalence of suffering among wild animals and the ways in which their interests can be harmed by natural processes. The book concludes that some interventions to reduce wild animal suffering are both feasible and morally justified.

== Reception ==
In Philosophy in Review, Christopher Bobier praised Animal Ethics in the Wild for its discussion of wild animal sentience and moral considerability. He wrote that Faria presents a case for intervention in nature to reduce wild animal suffering, and said that scholars in animal ethics, environmental ethics, ecology, conservation, and animal law would find the book accessible. Bobier also wrote that the book raises questions about the practical implications of intervention, including what obligations might apply to people living in urban areas. He noted that the book does not discuss zoos directly, but asked whether zoos might reduce suffering for some wild animals while also raising ethical concerns about captivity.

In Utilitas, Josh Milburn described the book as a sustained philosophical argument for the view that humans have a moral obligation to intervene in nature to reduce wild animal suffering. He discussed Faria's responses to perversity and futility objections, including her use of the reversal test, and her response to the jeopardy objection, which holds that intervention could threaten other values. Milburn also discussed Faria's treatment of relational arguments, priority, perfectionist objections, and the tractability of reducing wild animal suffering.

Cambridge University Press lists endorsements of the book from philosophers including Kyle Johannsen, Jeff McMahan, Siobhan O'Sullivan, Clare Palmer, Valéry Giroux, Núria Almiron, Paula Casal, Alasdair Cochrane, Peter Singer, and Oscar Horta. The biologist Marc Bekoff wrote in Psychology Today that the book should be "required reading for field researchers and anyone who spends a lot of time outdoors watching other animals".

== See also ==
- The Importance of Wild-Animal Suffering – 2009 essay by Brian Tomasik
- Wild Animal Ethics – 2020 book by Kyle Johannsen
