= Wild Animal Ethics =

2020 book by Kyle Johannsen

- First edition cover
- Author: Kyle Johannsen
- Language: English
- Subject: Animal ethics; Environmental ethics; Political philosophy; Wild animal suffering
- Publisher: Routledge
- Publication date: October 29, 2020
- Media type: Print and ebook
- Pages: 112
- ISBN: 978-0-429-29667-3
- OCLC: 1159605676

Wild Animal Ethics: The Moral and Political Problem of Wild Animal Suffering is a 2020 book by philosopher Kyle Johannsen, published by Routledge. It examines the moral and political obligations humans may have to reduce wild animal suffering, including suffering caused by natural processes rather than human activities. Drawing on deontological ethics and political philosophy, Johannsen argues that humans have a collective obligation to assist wild animals and to research safe methods of reducing suffering on a large scale.

The book discusses predation, disease, starvation, adverse weather, injury and parasitism, as well as reproductive strategies that result in high juvenile mortality. Johannsen examines objections to intervention based on the value of nature, animal liberty and ecological risks. He considers genetic engineering, including CRISPR and gene drives, as possible means of reducing suffering without requiring continuous human management of wild animal populations.

The book was discussed at an academic symposium organised by Animals in Philosophy, Politics, Law, and Ethics (APPLE) at Queen's University in 2021. Commentaries by Clare Palmer, Bob Fischer, Nicolas Delon and Gary David O'Brien, together with Johannsen's response, were subsequently published in Philosophia.

== Publication history ==
Wild Animal Ethics was first published by Routledge as an ebook on October 29, 2020, followed by hardcover and paperback editions on October 30. The book comprises 112 pages, including preliminary material, and contains six chapters.

The chapters examine the value of nature, collective obligations to wild animals, the risks of intervention, genetic modification and the implications of assisting wild animals for animal rights advocacy.

== Summary ==
=== Wild animal suffering and the value of nature ===
Johannsen examines the extent of suffering experienced by animals living in the wild. He discusses causes including predation, disease, starvation, adverse weather, injury and parasitism. Particular attention is given to species with reproductive strategies that produce large numbers of offspring, many of which die before reaching adulthood. Johannsen argues that the suffering associated with these reproductive patterns may cause many wild animals to have lives that are negative overall.

The book questions whether naturalness or wildness possesses intrinsic value independently of the welfare of individual animals. Johannsen challenges the view that natural processes should generally be left undisturbed simply because they are natural. He argues that the suffering of wild animals provides moral reasons for intervention, even when humans are not responsible for causing it.

=== Moral obligations and intervention ===
Johannsen argues that humans have collective moral obligations to assist wild animals. He grounds these obligations primarily in beneficence, rather than exclusively in duties to compensate animals for harms caused by humans. This allows him to extend moral consideration to suffering resulting from natural processes, including predation and high juvenile mortality.

He considers how such obligations might be fulfilled through collective institutions and public policy. The book also examines the relationship between assistance and justice, including whether humans acquire additional responsibilities when their interventions affect which animals come into existence.

Johannsen addresses two contrasting objections to intervention. One holds that ecological systems are too complex for large-scale assistance to be undertaken responsibly, because interventions may produce unforeseen harms. The other proposes deliberately reducing or destroying habitats to prevent the birth of animals whose lives would otherwise contain substantial suffering.

He rejects intentional habitat destruction, arguing that the negative duty not to harm animals is generally stronger than the positive duty to assist them. However, he maintains that the possibility of unforeseen consequences does not eliminate the moral reasons for researching safer interventions.

=== Genetic engineering ===
Johannsen examines genetic engineering as a possible method of reducing wild animal suffering. He discusses CRISPR and gene drives, which could potentially spread genetic modifications through wild populations without requiring repeated interventions in individual animals.

Among the possibilities considered are changes to reproductive strategies that would reduce the number of offspring dying prematurely, and alterations to the dietary behaviour of predators. Johannsen also considers modifying animals' capacity to experience suffering, although he favours approaches that address the causes of suffering without removing that capacity.

He argues that genetic modification could, in principle, reduce suffering while avoiding the continuous restrictions on animal liberty associated with conventional wildlife management. Nevertheless, he acknowledges that such interventions would require substantial research and testing before they could be undertaken responsibly, particularly because of the possibility of ecological disruption and unintended consequences.

The book concludes by discussing the implications of wild animal suffering for animal rights advocacy. Johannsen argues that concern for animals should extend beyond harms directly caused by humans and should include consideration of assistance to animals suffering from natural causes.

== Reception ==
=== Academic symposium ===
In April 2021, Animals in Philosophy, Politics, Law, and Ethics (APPLE) at Queen's University organised an online symposium on Wild Animal Ethics. The event featured commentaries by Nicolas Delon, Bob Fischer, Gary David O'Brien and Clare Palmer.

The commentaries and Johannsen's response were published online in September 2021 and appeared in volume 50, issue 3 (2022) of Philosophia.

=== Commentaries ===
Clare Palmer questioned Johannsen's arguments concerning the welfare of wild animals and the value of wildness. She maintained that the claim that most wild animals have very bad lives requires stronger empirical evidence. Palmer also argued that Johannsen underestimated the ethical importance of preserving wild nature. Although she did not regard this value as necessarily outweighing concerns about animal suffering, she argued that large-scale interventions would involve conflicts between different values that required more extensive consideration, particularly if such interventions were to obtain democratic legitimacy.

Bob Fischer challenged Johannsen's argument against intentional habitat destruction as a means of reducing suffering. He questioned Johannsen's estimates of the proportion of animals whose lives are positive overall and argued that the book's treatment of habitat destruction did not adequately establish its conclusions, given other moral considerations relevant to the issue.

Nicolas Delon argued that Johannsen's account gave insufficient attention to animal agency and freedom as components of well-being. He questioned how different understandings of animal welfare might affect the justification of interventions in nature. Although Delon recognised that Johannsen considered restrictions on liberty morally relevant, he argued that the importance of animals' ability to exercise agency required further examination.

Gary David O'Brien examined Johannsen's treatment of the nonidentity problem. He argued that interventions affecting which animals come into existence could create additional moral responsibilities. According to O'Brien, humans who knowingly cause animals to exist may become responsible for foreseeable harms those animals suffer or inflict on others. He maintained that these responsibilities arise from duties of justice rather than beneficence and may therefore be more demanding than Johannsen's account suggests.

=== Author's response ===
Johannsen responded to the four commentaries in "Defending Wild Animal Ethics". He defended his rejection of intrinsic value as a sufficient objection to assisting wild animals and maintained that intentional habitat destruction was impermissible within his moderate deontological framework.

He also addressed the relationship between animal well-being and agency, clarifying that his account did not treat pleasure and suffering as the only components of well-being. In response to O'Brien, Johannsen considered whether interventions affecting the identities of future animals could generate additional duties of justice. He also discussed the relationship between these duties and the collective obligation to reduce wild animal suffering.

=== Reviews ===
The book received favourable endorsements from philosophers Jeff Sebo and Jeff McMahan, both reproduced on the publisher's website. Sebo praised Johannsen's case for assisting wild animals and its consideration of animal welfare and animal rights. McMahan commended the book's treatment of wild animal suffering as a moral problem.

In a 2023 review for Animal Welfare, veterinary specialist Elizabeth Mullineaux described the book as accessible to readers without specialised knowledge of philosophy or animal welfare. She praised its discussion of genetic modification while acknowledging the considerable scientific and ethical difficulties associated with large-scale intervention. Mullineaux noted that many readers might favour reducing human-caused harm to wild animals over more extensive attempts to alter natural processes. She nevertheless recommended the book for its examination of ways to reduce wild animal suffering.

== See also ==
- The Importance of Wild-Animal Suffering – 2009 essay by Brian Tomasik
- Animal Ethics in the Wild – 2022 book by Catia Faria
