= Making a Stand for Animals =

2023 book about animal ethics

- Author: Oscar Horta
- Language: English
- Subjects: Animal ethics
- Published: 2022
- Publisher: Routledge
- Pages: 192
- ISBN: 978-1-03-225975-8
- OCLC: 1302331278

Making a Stand for Animals is a 2022 book by Oscar Horta, a moral philosopher at the University of Santiago de Compostela and the founder of the organization Animal Ethics. The book was initially published in Spanish as Un paso adelante en defensa de los animales by Plaza y Valdés in 2017. In the book, Horta examines many topics in the field of animal ethics, such as speciesism, sentience, wild animal suffering, veganism and longtermism.

== Summary ==
Horta begins chapter one by examining what speciesism is and why it is an unjustified discrimination. He claims that none of the defenses of the idea that the interests of nonhuman animals should count less than the interests of humans succeed. Then, in chapter two, Horta defines the concept of sentience, argues that the possession of this capacity should be what determines whether an individual ought to be morally considered or not, and examines the evidence available to assess which nonhuman animals are sentient.

Next, in chapter three, Horta describes in very vivid detail the wretched situation faced by the vast majority of nonhuman animals who are exploited by humans. He then presents a number of arguments in chapters four and five to conclude that we should not use nonhuman animals and that it is possible to lead a good life without eating them or exploiting them in other ways.

In the concluding chapters, Horta examines the various ways in which we can help improve the situation of nonhuman animals, especially those living in the wild and those who will exist in the future, such as by donating to effective charities, by helping or rescuing nonhuman animals living in the wild whenever we can, or by effecting long-lasting changes in the attitudes that the general public has toward nonhuman animals.

== Reception ==
The book has been reviewed in academic journals both in English and Spanish. In a review in English, Peter Sandøe claims that those who decide to read the book "should be able to enjoy and learn from grappling with the many simple, yet challenging arguments, mostly based on thought experiments, that Horta presents in the book". The book was similarly praised in several reviews in Spanish. For instance, Guillermo Lariguet claims that it is a "very well-written, clear, precise and profound book". Fernando Luna Hernández states that "it addresses the topic of animal sentience in a very simple, serious and instructive way". Brenda Yesenia Olalde Vázquez affirms that "it explains in a clear way concepts such as sentience and veganism" and that Horta invites us to reflect on how we can improve the situation of "the animals that are currently alive", as well as of "the future generations of nonhuman animals".

The book has also received reviews from Paola Cavalieri, Peter Singer, Alexandra Navarro, Steve Sapontzis, Lu Shegay, Angela Martin, Adewale O. Owoseni, Kyle Johannsen, Jens Tuider, Núria Almirón, Bob Fischer, Steven P. McCulloch and Dr Jeanette Rowley. Cavalieri describes the book as "a powerful plea for a radical change in our attitudes to animals, and in the way we treat them". Singer states that it is "an inspiring and ideal book to recommend to those who are beginning to walk the path of animal liberation, or to those who are totally unaware of it and wish to approach the subject", since it is "written in an agile and easy-to-understand way" and "it provides simple and convincing arguments for the defense of animals, going through all possible approaches".
