= Catia Faria =

Portuguese philosopher and activist (born 1980)

- Born: 1980 (age 45–46); Porto, Portugal

Education
- Education: University of Porto (B.A. in Philosophy); University of Barcelona (M.A. in Cognitive Sciences); Pompeu Fabra University (PhD in Moral Philosophy)
- Thesis: Animal Ethics Goes Wild: The Problem of Wild Animal Suffering and Intervention in Nature (2016)
- Doctoral advisors: Paula Casal, Oscar Horta, Joao Cardoso Rosas

Philosophical work
- Era: Contemporary philosophy
- Region: Western philosophy
- School: Analytic philosophy
- Institutions: University of Minho; Pompeu Fabra University; Complutense University of Madrid
- Language: English, Spanish, Portuguese
- Main interests: Animal ethics; applied ethics; environmental ethics; feminist ethics; normative ethics; population ethics; speciesism; wild animal suffering
- Notable works: Animal Ethics in the Wild: Wild Animal Suffering and Intervention in Nature (2022)
- Notable ideas: Xenozoopolis

Catia Faria (born 1980) is a Portuguese moral philosopher and activist for animal rights and feminism. She is assistant professor in applied ethics at the Complutense University of Madrid and a board member of the UPF-Centre for Animal Ethics. Her work is in normative ethics and applied ethics, with a focus on the moral consideration of non-human animals. Her first book, Animal Ethics in the Wild: Wild Animal Suffering and Intervention in Nature, was published in 2022.

== Education ==
Faria earned a B.A. in philosophy from the University of Porto, an M.A. in cognitive sciences from the University of Barcelona, and a PhD in moral philosophy from Pompeu Fabra University. Her doctoral thesis, Animal Ethics Goes Wild: The Problem of Wild Animal Suffering and Intervention in Nature, defended human assistance to non-human animals in the wild as a response to wild animal suffering. It was examined by Genoveva Martí, Alasdair Cochrane, and Jeff McMahan, and supervised by Paula Casal, Oscar Horta, and Joao Cardoso Rosas.

== Career ==
Faria is assistant professor in applied ethics at the Complutense University of Madrid. She was previously a postdoctoral researcher for the Portuguese Foundation for Science and Technology at the University of Minho, a lecturer in ethics and sustainability at Pompeu Fabra University, and a visiting researcher at the Oxford Uehiro Centre for Practical Ethics.

In 2015, Faria and Eze Paez co-edited a double volume of the journal Relations. Beyond Anthropocentrism on wild animal suffering and intervention in nature. She has written for the University of Oxford's Practical Ethics blog; Nietzsche's Horse, the animal issues blog of the Spanish online newspaper elDiario.es; and Pikara Magazine. In 2020, Faria and Oscar Horta co-authored a chapter on welfare biology in The Routledge Handbook of Animal Ethics. Her first book, Animal Ethics in the Wild: Wild Animal Suffering and Intervention in Nature, was published in 2022.

== Philosophy ==
Faria has criticised environmentalist arguments for leaving nature alone. She argues that environmentalists often support intervention in nature for anthropocentric reasons or for environmental aims, and has argued that animal ethics and environmental ethics are incompatible because they assign different moral weight to non-human animals. She argues that rejection of speciesism requires moral consideration for the interests and well-being of sentient non-human animals in the wild, and supports efforts to reduce harms that they experience from natural causes.

Faria argues that intersectional feminism and antispeciesism are both needed in work for equality and justice. She developed the concept of "xenozoopolis", a hybrid of xenofeminism and antispeciesism, which she describes as calling for the abolition of the "human-alien binary". She has also argued that a feminist approach to antispeciesism entails a commitment to veganism.

Faria has criticised ecofeminism for treating patriarchal culture as the main source of harm to non-human animals in the wild and conservation as the main way to help them. She argues that this view depends on an inaccurate account of nature as beneficial for non-human animals, and that suffering is common among such animals. She rejects forms of intervention in nature such as hunting, but argues that non-intervention does not follow from that rejection and that humans should work to help non-human animals in the wild.

== Selected publications ==
- ——; Almiron, Núria (2024). Especismo y lenguaje [Speciesism and Language] (in Spanish). Madrid: Plaza y Valdés. ISBN 9788417121730.
- —— (2022). Animal Ethics in the Wild: Wild Animal Suffering and Intervention in Nature. Cambridge University Press. ISBN 9781009100632.
- ——; Horta, Oscar (2020). "Welfare Biology". In Fischer, Bob (ed.). The Routledge Handbook of Animal Ethics. New York: Routledge. doi:10.4324/9781315105840-41. ISBN 978-1-351-60235-8. OCLC 1114567320. S2CID 241043958.
- ——; Paez, Eze (2019). "Why environmentalism cannot beat denialism: An antispeciesist approach to the ethics of climate change". In Almiron, Núria; Xifra, Jordi (eds.). Climate Change Denial and Public Relations: Strategic Communication and Interest Groups in Climate Inaction (1 ed.). Abingdon, Oxon; New York, NY: Routledge. doi:10.4324/9781351121798. ISBN 978-1-351-12179-8. S2CID 213336626.
- Almiron, Núria; —— (2019-07-01). "Environmental and Animal Defense". American Behavioral Scientist. 63 (8): 1043–1046. doi:10.1177/0002764219830458. hdl:10230/42775. ISSN 0002-7642. S2CID 151299541.
- Almiron, Núria; —— (2019-05-29). "Climate Change Impacts on Free-Living Nonhuman Animals. Challenges for Media and Communication Ethics". Studies in Media and Communication. 7 (1): 37. doi:10.11114/smc.v7i1.4305. hdl:10230/74086. ISSN 2325-808X.
- —— (May 2018). "A flimsy case for the use of non-human primates in research: a reply to Arnason". Journal of Medical Ethics. 44 (5): 332–333. doi:10.1136/medethics-2017-104444. ISSN 0306-6800. PMID 29032367. S2CID 207012970.
- —— (2016-06-30). "Why we should not postpone awareness of wild animal suffering". Animal Sentience. 1 (7). doi:10.51291/2377-7478.1099. ISSN 2377-7478.
- —— (2016-03-15). Animal ethics goes wild: The problem of wild animal suffering and intervention in nature (PhD thesis). Universitat Pompeu Fabra.
- —— (November 2015). "Disentangling Obligations of Assistance: a Reply to Clare Palmer's "Against the View That We Are Usually Required to Assist Wild Animals"". Relations. 3 (2) 7: 211–218. doi:10.7358/rela-2015-002-fari.
- ——; Paez, Eze (2014). "Anthropocentrism and speciesism: conceptual and normative issues". Revista de Bioética y Derecho (32): 95–103. doi:10.4321/S1886-58872014000300009. ISSN 1886-5887.
- —— (2014). "Equality, priority and nonhuman animals". Dilemata: International Journal of Applied Ethics. 14: 225–236.
- —— (2010). "Zamir, Tzachi, Ethics and the Beast: A Speciesist Argument for Animal Liberation". Telos (in Spanish). 17 (1): 109–120.

== See also ==
- Women and animal advocacy
