= Kyle Johannsen =

Canadian philosopher

Education
- Education: York University, Toronto (B.A., M.A.); Queen's University (PhD)
- Thesis: On the Conceptual Status of Justice (2015)
- Doctoral advisor: Christine Sypnowich

Philosophical work
- Era: Contemporary philosophy
- Region: Western philosophy
- School: Analytic philosophy
- Institutions: Trent University; Queen's University
- Main interests: Animal ethics; environmental ethics; political philosophy; social philosophy
- Notable works: A Conceptual Investigation of Justice (2018); Wild Animal Ethics (2020)
- Notable ideas: Ethical duties toward wild animals
- Website: sites.google.com/view/kyle-johannsen/

Kyle Johannsen is a Canadian philosopher whose work covers animal ethics, environmental ethics, political philosophy, and social philosophy. He has written on ethical duties toward wild animals. Johannsen is affiliated with Trent University and Queen's University. He is the author of A Conceptual Investigation of Justice (2018) and Wild Animal Ethics (2020), and the editor of Positive Duties to Wild Animals (2025). He hosts the Animal Studies podcast on the New Books Network.

== Education and career ==
Johannsen studied philosophy and history at York University, receiving a B.A. in 2007 and an M.A. in 2009. He completed a PhD in philosophy at Queen's University in 2015. In his fourth year at Queen's, he won first place in the Canadian Philosophical Association's student essay competition for "On the Normative Status of Justice". His dissertation, On the Conceptual Status of Justice, was supervised by Christine Sypnowich.

From 2016 to 2017, Johannsen was a visiting assistant professor at Saint Mary's University, Halifax. He was a visiting assistant professor at Trent University from 2017 to 2018 and remained there as a sessional faculty member from 2018. In 2020, he became an adjunct assistant professor at Queen's University and a Fellow in Animals in Philosophy, Politics, Law, and Ethics (APPLE). He is also a host of the Animal Studies podcast on the New Books Network.

== Works ==
Johannsen's first book, A Conceptual Investigation of Justice, was published in 2018 and was based on his doctoral dissertation. The book was the subject of a symposium at the Canadian Philosophical Association's 2018 meeting, and the papers from that symposium were later published in Dialogue: Canadian Philosophical Review.

His second book, Wild Animal Ethics, was published by Routledge in 2020. It argues that humans can have positive duties to reduce wild animal suffering, approaching the issue from a deontological perspective. In 2021, APPLE held a symposium on the book at Queen's University, and papers from the event were later published in Philosophia. The book was reviewed by Thomas Lepeltier in the French-language magazine Sciences Humaines.

In 2025, Johannsen edited Positive Duties to Wild Animals, a collection of essays on duties toward wild animals and intervention in nature. The volume was first published as a special issue of Ethics, Policy & Environment.

== Publications ==
=== Books ===
- Wild Animal Ethics: The Moral and Political Problem of Wild Animal Suffering. New York: Routledge. 2020-10-29. doi:10.4324/9780429296673. ISBN 978-0-429-29667-3.
- A Conceptual Investigation of Justice. New York: Routledge. 2018. doi:10.4324/9781315186184. ISBN 978-1-315-18618-4.

=== Edited volumes ===
- Johannsen, Kyle, ed. (2025). Positive Duties to Wild Animals. London: Routledge. doi:10.4324/9781003544739. ISBN 978-1-032-89818-6.

== See also ==
- Catia Faria – Portuguese philosopher and activist (born 1980)
- Oscar Horta – Spanish animal activist and moral philosopher (born 1974)
