= Mitchell Green =

American philosopher

- Occupation: Philosopher
- Employer: University of Connecticut

Mitchell Green is a professor of philosophy at the University of Connecticut, where he sits on the steering committee of the Cognitive Science program and the executive committee of the Graduate School. He is editor-in-chief of the journal Philosophia.

== Research work ==
His research focuses on philosophy of language, philosophy of mind, aesthetics, and pragmatics. He made influential contributions to speech act theory, the evolutionary biology of communication, to the study of empathy, self-knowledge, self-expression and attitude ascription, and to the epistemology of fiction. His account of communication as self-expression, develops the idea that communication is best understood as a tool for signalling and showing our internal mental states. Green's influential research has been celebrated by a special issue of the international journal Grazer Philosophische Studien, titled Sources of Meaning. Themes from Mitchell S. Green, edited by J. Michel, and by a special issue of the journal Organon Filozofia (vol. 28, 2021), titled The Origins of Meaning and the Nature of Speech Acts, edited by M. Witek.

Green previously held a professor position at the University of Virginia (from 1993 to 2013), and currently runs an MOOC at Coursera. He has held fellowships from the National Science Foundation, the National Humanities Center, the Center for Contemplative Mind in Society, and the American Council of Learned Societies. He has held visiting research positions at Singapore Management University (2008), the University of Muenster (2015), and was a Mercator Fellow at the Ruhr University Bochum, in the Emmy Noether Research Group (2020–21).

== Publications ==
=== Books ===
- William Lycan on Mind, Meaning, and Method, co-edited with J. Michel. Palgrave, 2025. ISBN 978-3031557705
- The Philosophy of Language, Oxford University Press, 2021. ISBN 978-0190853044
- Know Thyself: The Value and Limits of Self-Knowledge Routledge, 2017. ISBN 9781138675995
- Self-Expression, Oxford University Press, 2007 ISBN 978-0-19-928378-1
- Engaging Philosophy: A Brief Introduction, Hackett Publishing Company, 2006. ISBN 087220796X.
- Moore's Paradox: New Essays on Belief, Rationality and the First Person, co-edited with John Williams, including eleven previously unpublished essays. Oxford University Press, 2007 ); ISBN 0-19-928279-X

=== Encyclopedia articles ===
- 'Speech Acts,' in E. Zalta (ed.) The Stanford Encyclopedia of Philosophy. (Orig. 2007; revisions 2014.)

=== Highly cited articles ===
- Green, Mitchell (June 1, 2010). "II—Mitchell Green: Perceiving Emotions". Aristotelian Society Supplementary Volume. 84 (1): 45–61. doi:10.1111/j.1467-8349.2010.00185.x.
- Green, Mitchell S. (April 2009). "Speech Acts, the Handicap Principle and the Expression of Psychological States". Mind & Language. 24 (2): 139–163. doi:10.1111/j.1468-0017.2008.01357.x.
- Green, Mitchell S. (September 2007). "Direct Reference, Empty Names and Implicature". Canadian Journal of Philosophy. 37 (3): 419–447. doi:10.1353/cjp.2007.0021.
- Green, Mitchell S. (2000). "Illocutionary Force And Semantic Content". Linguistics and Philosophy. 23 (5): 435–473. doi:10.1023/A:1005642421177.
- Green, Mitchell S. (1998). "Direct Reference and Implicature". Philosophical Studies. 91 (1): 61–90. doi:10.1023/A:1004212614842.
- Green, Mitchell S. (February 1995). "Quantity, volubility, and some varieties of discourse". Linguistics and Philosophy. 18 (1): 83–112. doi:10.1007/BF00984962.
- Belnap, Nuel; Green, Mitchell (1994). "Indeterminism and the Thin Red Line". Philosophical Perspectives. 8: 365–388. doi:10.2307/2214178. JSTOR 2214178.
- Green, Mitchell (January 2017). "Imagery, expression, and metaphor". Philosophical Studies. 174 (1): 33–46. doi:10.1007/s11098-015-0607-x.
- Marsili, Neri; Green, Mitchell (August 2021). "Assertion: A (partly) social speech act". Journal of Pragmatics. 181: 17–28. doi:10.1016/j.pragma.2021.03.016. hdl:2445/230451.
