= International Society for Environmental Ethics =

Organization in Texas, US

The International Society for Environmental Ethics (ISEE) is an environmental organization based at the University of North Texas founded in 1990 with Holmes Rolston III as its first president.

The organization aims to promote the correct human use and understanding of the natural world. It maintains a website and sponsors the Online Bibliography of Environmental Thought (OBET), a bibliography for environmental ethics. It hosts an annual summer conference: the 2024, 21st edition happened in Freiburg. In conjunction with the International Association for Environmental Philosophy (IAEP) and with sponsorship from the Center for Environmental Philosophy, the organization co-organized an annual joint ISEE-IAEP conference between 2005 and 2011.
