= Animal disenhancement =

Genetically reducing the capacities of animals

Animal disenhancement (or diminishment) is the practice of selectively breeding or genetically engineering animals to reduce their natural capacities. A mainly scientific rather than industrial practice, ethicists have debated using it for livestock rearing and for lab animals. The term animal disenhancement was coined and popularized by agriculture ethicist Paul B. Thompson. A prominent example is when breeding chickens for livestock rearing, to breed genetically blind chickens. Livestock living conditions lead chickens to peck their peers, and blind chickens peck each other less than sighted chickens. A strain of chickens without eyesight were accidentally bred in Canada in 1984 and they were not as stressed in large groups as those with eyesight. Normal chickens were aggressive and pecked their peers but these blind chickens were less aggressive and did not harm each other as much. Current industry standard with sighted chickens is "beak-trimming" (cutting off the sharp tips of their beaks), which causes acute and chronic pain.

Animal ethicists have argued that farming diminished animals is morally preferable to farming present-day breeds if their lives contain less suffering. However, they have disagreed as to whether diminished animals' lives do indeed contain less suffering. Animal disenhancement can be seen as a spectrum, at the end of which lie animal microencephalic lumps (also microcephalic, AMLs). AMLs are hypothetical non-sentient animals that humans might some day create. AMLs would have such small brains that they would lack the cognitive capacity to feel pain or have interests.

The chicken strain accidentally developed in 1984 was kept alive and continued to be bred for research, with new research published in October 2026.

== Dumb Down vs Build Up ==
Animal disenhancement is the Dumb Down counterpart to the Build Up approach of building non-sentient cells for cultured meat or other forms of cellular agriculture.

Inspired by human enhancement in which nanotechnologies are used to improve a human’s cognitive abilities but it could also be reversed and used to reduce animals’ cognitive abilities, Dumb Down was imagined by Bernard Rollin. Rollin wanted to test painful diseases on animals and he wanted the animals to exhibit the diseases for research on biomedicine. Although it was only a concept, he imagined the possibility of genetically modifying the pain receptors of animals so that they would not show pain. However, with this idea, many criticized the moral ethics of it. One of the groups Rollin faced stated that this could hurt the "dignity" of the organisms. Another scientist named Adam Shriver has expressed that we should replace farm animals with ones that have been genetically modified or engineered to not have brain enzymes that trigger pain. Animals would have a different feeling and reaction but not in a way that is thought of as painful and is associated with suffering.

== Why Animal Disenhancement Might Be Necessary ==
Peter Singer wrote “Animal Liberation” as a way to spread the animal liberation movement. He argued that people should become vegetarians because of the immense suffering that millions of animals must endure on farms. This book was written in 1975 and has convinced millions to become vegetarian. Unfortunately, the consumption of meat has gone up by over 30 pounds per person by 2007 in the United States. With the population also rising, the efforts of animal rights activists have not been enough. This is why Adam Shriver in 2009 proposed the idea of reducing suffering by eliminating animals’ brain functions so they cannot suffer from pain.

Since Shriver's proposal, Peter Singer in his 2023 follow-up book Animal Liberation Now clarified that people should aim to go fully vegan rather than just vegetarian. In his utilitarian worldview, it is not wrong to go only 90% vegan; it is 90% as good.

== Disenhancement of lab animals ==
Animal disenhancement might contribute to the third of the 3 Rs, a framework developed by William Russell and Rex Burch to regulate more humane animal research. The 3 Rs stand for replacement, reduction, and refinement. Full replacement aims to substitute the use of animals that are exploited for research. There is also partial replacement which can include animals in operations where they do not suffer much. Reduction means limiting the number of animals used and refinement means limiting the suffering that animals must endure.

Refinement matters because it is well known that animal research causes lots of pain and lab animal deaths have grown to millions every year. The general consensus is that this pain is morally wrong. The reason that it is hard to reduce this suffering and to carry out stricter policies is that it can be expensive. As well as being expensive, it must be able to be applied to large amounts of animals. To enhance animal welfare and to reduce this suffering, a possible solution is genetic disenhancement.

== See also ==
- Cellular agriculture, the production of animal tissue from cells rather than living animals.
- Cultured meat, an instance of cellular agriculture.
