= Paula Casal =

Spanish philosopher

Paula Casal is an ICREA Professor in the Law Department of Pompeu Fabra University. She was previously a Reader in Moral and Political Philosophy at Reading University (2004–2008) and a Lecturer at Keele University (1996–2004). She was also a Fellow in Ethics at Harvard University (1999–2000), a Keele Junior Research Fellow, also at Harvard (2000–2001), a Hoover Fellow at Université Catholique de Louvain (2001–2002), and a Leverhulme Research Fellow at the University of Oxford (2002–2004). Her work has appeared in journals such as Ethics, Economics and Philosophy, Journal of Medical Ethics, Journal of Political Philosophy, Hypatia, Political Studies, and Utilitas. She is an associate editor of Politics, Philosophy & Economics, co-editor of Law Ethics and Philosophy, President of the Great Ape Project-Spain, and one of the founders—with Keith Horton, Meena Krishnamurthy, and Thomas Pogge—of Academics Stand Against Poverty. She is also the co-director of the UPF-Centre for Animal Ethics, with Núria Almiron.

== Works ==
=== Distributive justice ===
Casal teaches distributive justice in the MA programs of Pompeu Fabra University and the University of Barcelona. This is a part of political philosophy that discusses the just distribution of resources, whether this be within a family or a country, or across several countries, generations, or even species. Casal is credited with having produced the most comprehensive and lucid analysis of the arguments for and against the principle of sufficiency, according to which individuals are entitled to protection against various forms of absolute deprivation. Her paper "Why Sufficiency Is Not Enough" has generated an extensive literature, including various responses from Robert Huseby, Liam Shields, and Lasse Nielsen, among others. She has also extensively discussed the work of her Oxford supervisor G. A. Cohen.

=== Environmental taxation ===
Casal argues that a green fiscal reform is urgently needed in order to reduce climate change, and that it is important to design environmental taxes so that they lack a regressive effect, since regressive taxes are not only less fair than progressive taxes but also less likely to be politically feasible, as those who support environmental taxes tend to reject regressive taxation. She explains various methods for eliminating any regressive impact and gives several philosophical arguments for employing them.

Casal also advocates environmental taxes globally, as a way to simultaneously reduce global poverty and climate change, which she considers the two largest challenges facing humanity today. She debates with Thomas Pogge and Hillel Steiner the best design for such a global tax and transfer scheme, both in journal articles and in their jointly authored book Un reparto mas justo del planeta (2016). Here Pogge defends the Global Resources Dividend: a flat tax on the use of natural resources, to be distributed according to the principle of sufficiency; while Steiner defends the Global Fund: a flat 100% tax on the rental value of any owned natural resources, to be distributed according to the principle of equality; whereas Casal defends a progressive tax rate rather than a flat one, and a hybrid tax base (on use and ownership), to be distributed according to the principle of priority to the worst off.

=== Procreative justice ===
Casal has also written on procreative justice: a part of distributive justice that concerns how the cost of children should be distributed, both when we assume that children have positive externalities because they are future pension contributors, and when we assume that their externalities are negative because of their environmental impact. A paper that Casal coauthored with Andrew Williams in response to Ronald Dworkin, to which Dworkin replied, spurred this growing area of inquiry, with further responses from Idil Boran, Paul Bou-Habib, Tim Meijers, Serena Olsaretti, and Patrick Tomlin, among others.

=== Animal ethics ===
Casal's best-known contributions to animal ethics are her introduction to the Spanish edition of Peter Singer's Animal Liberation, her defense of the rights of self-aware animals like great apes, elephants, and cetaceans, and her critique of whaling, bullfighting, and other traditions involving animal suffering. She coauthored, with Peter Singer, the book Los derechos de los simios (2022), which was published in Spanish to support the creation of a Great Ape Law in Spain.

=== Evolution ===
Casal's work sometimes draws on evolution, and she has produced several essays on the overlap between distributive justice and evolutionary biology. She has interviewed various biologists for the journal Mètode, including Robin Dunbar, Frans de Waal, Robert Trivers, Robert Sapolsky, and Lori Marino.

=== Fiction ===
Casal has written and illustrated Martina y el mar (2007), a novel about whales and climate change oriented towards a young audience, "La Anestesista" (2011), a story about bullfighting, La lagartija poeta (2021), a book of poems for children about animals, freedom, and self-acceptance, and a book to teach very young or dyslexic children how to read, called The Life of the Alphabet (forthcoming with Babidibú). She is the godchild of the Galician writer Álvaro Cunqueiro, who wrote stories for her and her siblings, which are collected in Jordán escondido y otros cuentos (2007), with Casal's prologue explaining her childhood with Cunqueiro.
