= Oscar Horta =

Spanish philosopher and antispeciesist activist (born 1974)

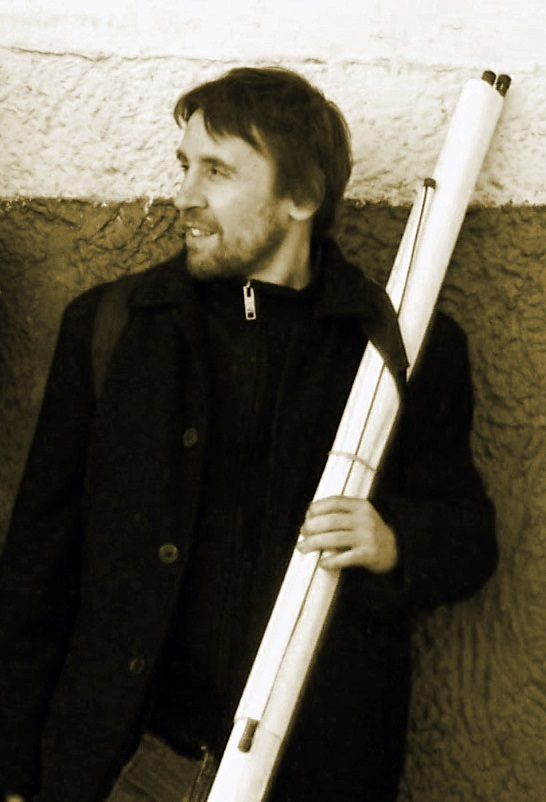
- Horta in 2012
- Born: Óscar Horta Álvarez; 7 May 1974 (age 52); Vigo, Spain
- Awards: Ferrater Mora Essay Prize (2007)

Education
- Education: University of Santiago de Compostela
- Thesis: Un desafío para la bioética: la cuestión del especismo ("A Challenge to Bioethics: The Issue of Speciesism") (2007)
- Doctoral advisor: Luis García Soto

Philosophical work
- Era: Contemporary philosophy
- School: Analytic philosophy
- Institutions: University of Santiago de Compostela
- Main interests: Animal ethics; speciesism; wild animal suffering; bioethics
- Notable works: Making a Stand for Animals (2022)
- Website: masalladelaespecie.wordpress.com

Oscar Horta (born Óscar Horta Álvarez; 7 May 1974) is a Spanish moral philosopher and antispeciesist activist. He is a professor of philosophy at the University of Santiago de Compostela and a co-founder of the nonprofit organisation Animal Ethics. He has been involved in vegan advocacy since the mid-1990s and has worked with several Spanish animal rights organisations.

Horta's philosophical work concerns speciesism, animal ethics and the moral consideration of sentient beings. He supports extending rights to non-human animals while arguing that opposition to speciesism also requires addressing forms of discrimination that do not involve rights violations. His work also examines welfare biology and the reduction of wild animal suffering through intervention in nature. He is the author of several books, including Making a Stand for Animals (2022), his first book published in English.

== Education ==
Horta completed an undergraduate degree in philosophy at the University of Santiago de Compostela (USC) in 1999 and a doctorate in philosophy at the same institution in 2007. His doctoral thesis, Un desafío para la bioética: la cuestión del especismo ("A Challenge to Bioethics: The Issue of Speciesism"), was supervised by Luis García Soto.

In 2007, Horta received the Ferrater Mora Essay Prize for his study of the moral philosophy of José Ferrater Mora. The prize was awarded jointly by the Ferrater Mora Foundation and the Ferrater Mora Chair of Contemporary Thought at the University of Girona.

== Career ==
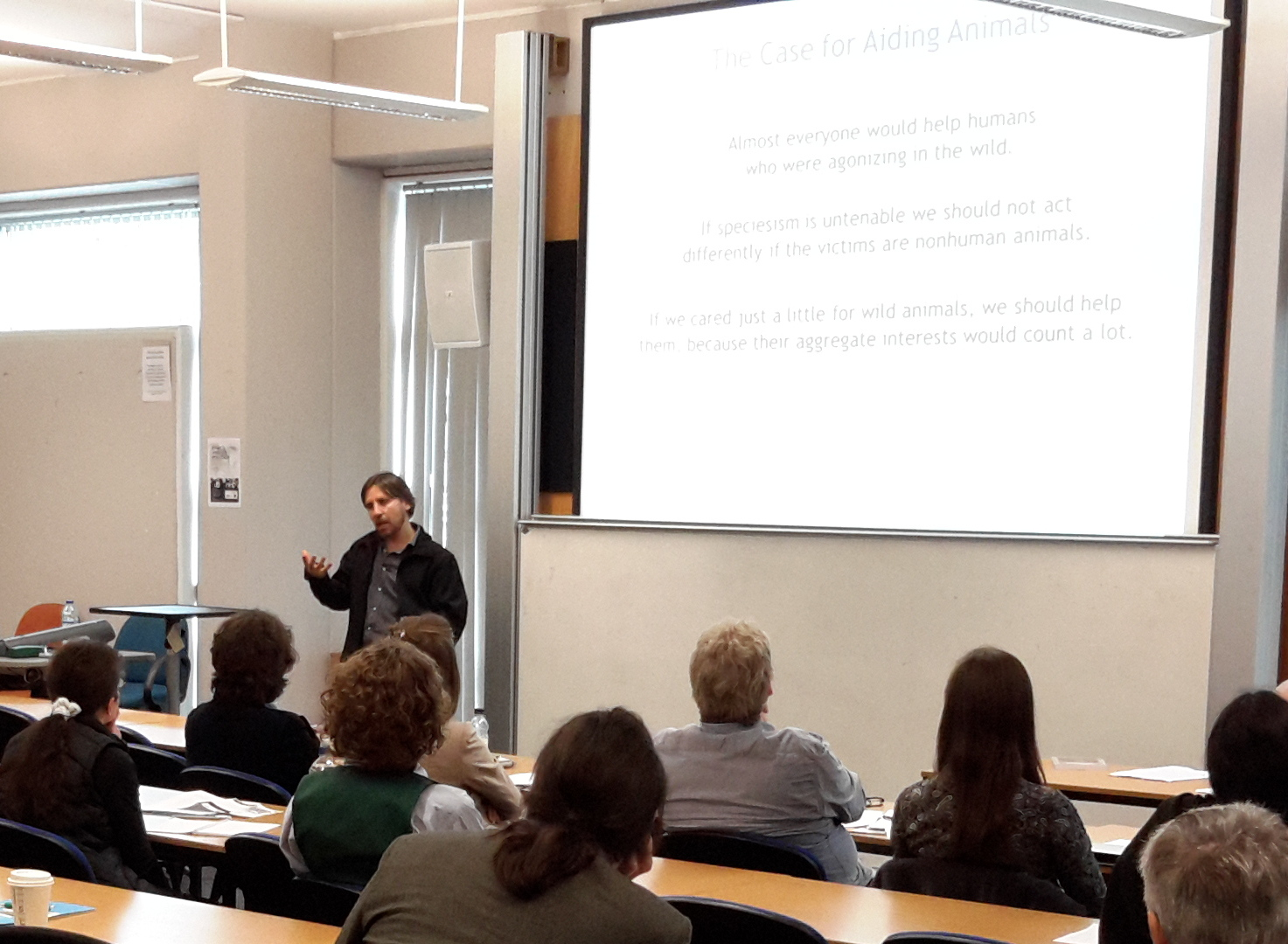
Horta delivering a lecture, "Intervention in Nature in Ethics and/or Politics: Addressing Issues Related to Non-human Animals", in 2015

From 2005 to 2009, Horta was a lecturer in the Department of Logic and Moral Philosophy at USC. He was a visiting researcher at Rutgers University from 2009 to 2010 and held a research fellowship at the Spanish Foundation for Science and Technology from 2009 to 2011. He returned to USC in 2011 as a lecturer in the Department of Philosophy and Anthropology, becoming a professor in 2018.

Horta has been active in vegan and antispeciesist advocacy since the mid-1990s. He worked as an organiser and spokesperson for the Spanish animal rights organisations Derechos para los Animales ("Rights for Animals") and Alternativa para la Liberación Animal ("Alternative for Animal Liberation"), which merged to form Equanimal. Equanimal subsequently merged with Animal Equality in 2012.

In 2012, Horta co-founded the animal advocacy organisation Animal Ethics. He has also been involved with the advisory boards of the Sentience Institute, UPF-Centre for Animal Ethics and Organisation for the Prevention of Intense Suffering.

In 2018, Horta spoke at EA Global in London, an effective altruism conference, about promoting welfare biology as a field of research.

In 2022, Horta published Making a Stand for Animals, his first English-language book. It examines the moral consideration of non-human animals, criticism of speciesism, human uses of animals and suffering experienced by wild animals.

== Philosophical work ==
=== Speciesism ===
Horta defines speciesism as unjustified disadvantageous consideration or treatment of individuals who are not classified as belonging to one or more particular species. His definition treats speciesism as a form of discrimination and is therefore normative, since it regards speciesist treatment as unjustified by definition.

Under this account, different treatment of individuals belonging to different species is not necessarily speciesist. The distinction depends on whether the unequal consideration or treatment is justified. Horta also argues that speciesism need not involve explicit discrimination on the basis of species membership. It can include the disadvantageous treatment of individuals excluded from a favoured species on other grounds, such as their cognitive abilities. He draws comparisons with sexism and racism, which can likewise involve discrimination based on characteristics other than sex or ancestry.

Horta distinguishes speciesism from anthropocentrism. He describes discrimination favouring humans over other animals as anthropocentric speciesism, but maintains that speciesist discrimination can also occur between different groups of non-human animals. His account therefore extends beyond discrimination favouring humans specifically.

Horta also distinguishes antispeciesism from animal rights advocacy. In a 2010 interview, he argued that someone could support legal rights for non-human animals while continuing to discriminate against them in circumstances not involving exploitation. He therefore regards antispeciesism as a broader position, encompassing opposition to unjustified discrimination against animals whether or not they are used as human resources.

Horta's normative definition has been challenged by philosopher François Jaquet, who argues that speciesism should instead be understood as a descriptive concept that does not presuppose the moral wrongness of the treatment it identifies.

=== Wild animal suffering ===
Horta argues that wild animals experience substantial suffering from natural causes, including disease, predation, starvation and exposure to adverse environmental conditions. He challenges what he calls the idyllic view of nature, under which natural processes are generally regarded as beneficial or morally desirable. Drawing on population dynamics, he argues that many animals reproduce in large numbers but have offspring with low probabilities of surviving to adulthood, resulting in substantial suffering and premature death.

Horta maintains that rejecting speciesism provides reasons to consider the interests of wild animals and to intervene in natural processes when doing so can reduce suffering without causing greater harm. He disputes the view that natural processes should ordinarily be left untouched, arguing that the interests of sentient individuals should take precedence over preserving natural processes for their own sake.

Existing forms of assistance to wild animals include rescue operations during natural disasters, care for orphaned and injured animals, vaccination programmes and supplementary feeding. Horta argues that such measures could be expanded and that initial programmes could focus on animals living in urban, suburban and agricultural environments, where intervention may be less controversial than in relatively undisturbed ecosystems.

He has also advocated further research into the causes of wild animal suffering and the feasibility of interventions intended to improve the welfare of animals affected by natural processes, including circumstances where natural and human-caused factors interact.

Horta has written on welfare biology, a proposed field of research concerned with the conditions affecting the well-being of wild animals and the means of improving their lives. In a chapter co-authored with philosopher Catia Faria, he argues for studying the causes of suffering among wild animals and developing safe, feasible interventions expected to reduce suffering without causing greater harm.

Philosopher Jeff McMahan, whose essay "The Meat Eaters" appeared in The New York Times, has attributed his interest in wild animal suffering to Horta.

== Personal life ==
Horta has been vegan since the 1990s. He has said that his decision to become vegan was based on arguments he found persuasive rather than feelings of empathy towards non-human animals.

== Publications ==
Horta has published philosophical works in Spanish, Galician, Portuguese, English, Italian, French, and German.

- Horta, Oscar (2022). Making a Stand for Animals. London: Routledge. doi:10.4324/9781003285922. ISBN 978-1-00-328592-2. S2CID 248280373.
- Horta, Oscar. 2020. Faria, Catia. "Welfare Biology", in Fischer, Bob (ed.) The Routledge Handbook of Animal Ethics, New York: Routledge, pp. 455–466. ISBN 978-1315105840
- Horta, Oscar. 2019. Na defensa dos animais, Rianxo: Axóuxere Editora, ISBN 978-8494855306.
- Horta, Oscar. 2018. "Discrimination against vegans". Res Publica 24 (3): 359–373. doi:10.1007/s11158-017-9356-3.
- Horta, Oscar. 2018. "Concern for wild animal suffering and environmental ethics: What are the limits of the disagreement?". Les ateliers de l'éthique 13 (1): 85–100. doi:10.7202/1055119ar
- Horta, Oscar. 2018. "Moral considerability and the argument from relevance". Journal of Agricultural and Environmental Ethics 31 (3): 369–388. doi:10.1007/s10806-018-9730-y.
- Horta, Oscar. 2017. "Animal Suffering in Nature: The Case for Intervention". Environmental Ethics 39 (3): 261–279. doi:10.5840/enviroethics201739320.
- Horta, Oscar. 2017. "Why the concept of moral status should be abandoned". Ethical Theory and Moral Practice 20 (4): 899–910. doi:10.1007/s10677-017-9829-7.
- Horta, Oscar. 2017. Un paso adelante en defensa de los animales, Madrid: Plaza y Valdés, ISBN 978-8417121044.
- Horta, Oscar. 2017. "Population Dynamics Meets Animal Ethics", in Garmendia, Gabriel and Woodhall, Andrew (eds.) Ethical and Political Approaches to Nonhuman Animal Issues: Towards an Undivided Future. Basingstoke: Palgrave Macmillan, 365–389.
- Horta, Oscar. 2015. "Speziesismus", in Ferrari, Arianna and Petrus, Klaus (eds.) Lexikon der Mensch/Tier-Beziehungen, Bielefeld: Transcript, 318–320.
- Horta, Oscar. 2014. "The scope of the argument from species overlap". Journal of Applied Philosophy 31 (2): 142–154. doi:10.1111/japp.12051.
- Horta, Oscar. 2014. Una morale per tutti gli animali: al di là dell'ecologia, Milano: Mimesis, ISBN 978-8857521381.
- Horta, Oscar. 2013. "Zoopolis, Intervention and the State of Nature". Law, Ethics and Philosophy 1: 113–125.
- Horta, Oscar. 2010. "The Ethics of the Ecology of Fear against the Nonspeciesist Paradigm: A Shift in the Aims of Intervention in Nature". Between the Species 13 (10): 163–187. doi:10.15368/bts.2010v13n10.10.
- Horta, Oscar. 2010. "Debunking the idylic view of natural processes: Population dynamics and suffering in the wild". Telos 17 (1): 73–88.
- Horta, Oscar. 2010. "What is speciesism?". Journal of Agricultural and Environmental Ethics 23 (3): 243–266. doi:10.1007/s10806-009-9205-2.

== See also ==
- List of animal rights advocates
