= UPF-Centre for Animal Ethics =

Spanish animal advocacy think tank

- Abbreviation: UPF-CAE
- Formation: December 2015; 10 years ago
- Type: Think tank
- Location: Barcelona, Spain
- Region served: Europe
- Co-directors: Núria Almiron; Paula Casal
- Affiliations: Pompeu Fabra University
- Website: upf.edu/web/cae-center-for-animal-ethics

The UPF-Centre for Animal Ethics (UPF-CAE) is an animal advocacy think tank based at Pompeu Fabra University in Barcelona, Spain. It works on animal ethics, anti-speciesism, and non-anthropocentric ethical perspectives in academia, politics, and the media. The centre was established in December 2015.

== History and activities ==
The UPF-Centre for Animal Ethics was established in December 2015. La Vanguardia described it at the time as the first think tank on animal ethics in Spain.

In 2019, the centre co-organised the 6th Conference of the European Association for Critical Animal Studies in Barcelona, together with the European Association for Critical Animal Studies.

The centre launched the Media Observatory of Speciesism in 2018. The observatory analyses the representation of animals in the media from an anti-speciesist perspective and publishes recommendations on media coverage.

== See also ==
- Animal Ethics (organization)
- Oxford Centre for Animal Ethics
