= Philosophia (journal) =

Global philosophical journal

- Discipline: Philosophy
- Language: English
- Edited by: Mitchell Green

Publication details
- History: 1971–present
- Publisher: Springer Science+Business Media
- Frequency: 5 issues per year

Standard abbreviations
- ISO 4: Philosophia (Ramat Gan)
- NLM: Philosophia (Ramat Gan)

Indexing
- ISSN: 0048-3893 (print); 1574-9274 (web)
- LCCN: 70955463
- OCLC no.: 610312518

Links
- Journal homepage; Online access

Philosophia: A Global Journal of Philosophy, established in 1971, is a peer-reviewed academic journal covering philosophy from different traditions. Five issues per year are published by Springer Nature. The editor-in-chief is Mitchell Green (University of Connecticut).

== Abstracting and indexing ==
The journal is abstracted and indexed in:

- Scopus
- EBSCO databases
- Arts & Humanities Citation Index
- Current Contents/Arts and Humanities
- FRANCIS
- International Bibliography of Periodical Literature
- PASCAL
- The Philosopher's Index
