= Journal of Agricultural and Environmental Ethics =

- Discipline: Bioethics, agricultural science, environmental science
- Language: English
- Edited by: Jeffrey Burkhardt

Publication details
- Former name: Journal of Agricultural Ethics
- History: 1988-present
- Publisher: Springer Science+Business Media
- Frequency: Biannual
- Impact factor: 1.188 (2015)

Standard abbreviations
- ISO 4: J. Agric. Environ. Ethics

Indexing
- CODEN: JAEVEI
- ISSN: 1187-7863
- LCCN: 91016292 sn 91016292
- OCLC no.: 525578100

Links
- Journal homepage; Online access

The Journal of Agricultural and Environmental Ethics is a biannual peer-reviewed academic journal covering agricultural science and bioethics. It was established in 1988 as the Journal of Agricultural Ethics, obtaining its current name in 1991. The editor-in-chief is Jeffrey Burkhardt (Institute of Food and Agricultural Sciences). According to the Journal Citation Reports, the journal has a 2015 impact factor of 1.188, ranking it 19th out of 51 journals in the category "Ethics".

== Aims and scope ==
The journal publishes original research and policy perspectives on ethical issues involved in agriculture, food production, food consumption, environmental practices, and human-animal interactions. It welcomes multidisciplinary, interdisciplinary, and transdisciplinary contributions that demonstrate an explicit normative perspective. Topics covered by the journal include agricultural production systems, consumption styles and diets, food safety and affordability, technologies used in animal agriculture, agricultural policies and regulations, climate change mitigation and adaptation, ecological conservation, knowledge production in agriculture, and human-animal relations.

== Abstracting and indexing ==
The journal is abstracted and indexed in Scopus, Science Citation Index Expanded, Social Sciences Citation Index, and Arts & Humanities Citation Index, among other databases.

According to the publisher, the journal has a 2024 impact factor of 2.8.

== See also ==
- List of ethics journals
