= Bob Fischer (philosopher) =

American ethicist

- Born: Robert William Fischer
- Occupation: Professor

Education
- Education: State University of New York at Geneseo (BA); University of Illinois Chicago (MA and PhD)
- Thesis: Modal Knowledge, in Theory (2011)
- Doctoral advisor: W. D. Hart

Philosophical work
- Era: Contemporary philosophy
- Region: United States
- Institutions: Texas State University
- Main interests: Epistemology; ethics
- Notable ideas: Theory-Based Epistemology of Modality
- Website: www.bobfischer.net

Bob Fischer is an American philosopher who specializes in epistemology (especially modal epistemology) and ethics (especially animal ethics). He is a Professor of Philosophy at Texas State University and a Senior Research Manager at Rethink Priorities. His books include Modal Justification via Theories (in which he defends his account of "Theory-Based Epistemology of Modality"), The Ethics of Eating Animals, and Weighing Animal Welfare.

== Education and career ==
Fischer earned a Bachelor of Arts in philosophy and English at State University of New York at Geneseo from 2001 to 2004. He received a PhD in philosophy at the University of Illinois Chicago. He submitted his doctoral thesis, which was entitled Modal Knowledge, in Theory, in 2011. His advisor (and thesis committee chair) was W. D. Hart; the other committee members were Colin Klein, Walter Edelberg, Daniel Sutherland, and Karen Bennett.

From Illinois, he moved to Texas State University, first (2011–2013) as a senior lecturer, and subsequently as an assistant professor of philosophy (2013–19), an associate professor of philosophy (2019–2024), and professor of philosophy (2024–present). Fischer is a senior research manager at Rethink Priorities and, along with Mark Budolfson and Lisa Kramer, a director of the Animal Welfare Economics Working Group.

== Research ==
Fischer's philosophical work spans epistemology and animal ethics.

Fischer's first monograph was Modal Justification via Theories, in which he defends a "Theory-Based Epistemology of Modality". According to this account, agents can have a justified belief in modal claims about certain kinds of "extraordinary" matters (e.g., philosophical issues) only if the claim follows from a theory in which they have a justified belief. Key to Fischer's account is that abductive reasoning (such as appeals to the virtue of simplicity) is well-placed to help agents to identify the theories that they are justified in believing. The epistemologists Antonella Mallozzi, Anand Vaidya, and Michael Wallner give the example of mind-body dualism. On Fischer's Theory-Based Epistemology of Modality, "we are justified in believing that mind-body dualism is metaphysically possible only if we are justified in believing a theory T from which mind-body dualism follows", but if T "is not the simplest theory, all else being equal, then one would not be justified in believing it, and thus not be justified in believing that mind-body dualism is metaphysically possible".

In 2024, Fischer published Weighing Animal Welfare, which collects the research that he and his team did from 2021-2023 on interspecies welfare comparisons. Interspecies welfare comparisons involve estimating the relative well-being levels of members of different species. For instance, if someone judges that a chicken in a battery cage is worse off than a human living a normal life, that person is making an interspecies welfare comparison. The book shows how it may be possible to make such comparisons by finding a mix of behavioral and physiological proxies for possible differences in the intensities of valenced experiences (like pleasure and pain). It then reports the results of applying that methodology.

Fischer has also conducted research on insect sentience and welfare, examining whether insects can feel pain and the ethical implications for their treatment.

== Selected publications ==
Monographs

- Fischer, Bob (2017). Modal Justification via Theories. Springer.
- Fischer, Bob (2020). The Ethics of Eating Animals: Usually Bad, Sometimes Wrong, Often Permissible. Routledge.

Debate books

- Jauernig, Anja, and Bob Fischer (2024). What Do We Owe Other Animals? A Debate. Routledge.

Textbooks

- Fischer, Bob (2021). Animal Ethics: A Contemporary Introduction. Routledge.
- Palmer, Clare, Bob Fischer, Christian Gamborg, Jordan Hampton, and Peter Sandøe (2023). Wildlife Ethics: The Ethics of Wildlife Management and Conservation. Wiley.

Edited books

- Bramble, Ben, and Bob Fischer (eds.) (2015). The Moral Complexities of Eating Meat. Oxford University Press.
- Fischer, Bob, and Felipe Leon (eds.) (2017). Modal Epistemology After Rationalism. Springer.
- Fischer, Bob (ed.) (2017). College Ethics: A Reader on Moral Issues That Affect You. Oxford University Press.
  - Second edition published 2020.
- Fischer, Bob (ed.) (2020). The Routledge Handbook of Animal Ethics. Routledge.
- Fischer, Bob (ed.) (2020). Ethics, Left and Right: The Moral Issues That Divide Us. Oxford University Press.
- Weston, Anthony, and Bob Fischer (eds.) (2023). A 21st Century Ethical Toolbox (5th ed.). Oxford University Press.
- Fischer, Bob (ed.) (2024). Weighing Animal Welfare: Comparing Well-being Across Species. Oxford University Press.
