= Núria Almiron =

Spanish researcher (born 1967)

- Born: Núria Almiron Roig; 1967 (age 58–59); Sabadell, Catalonia, Spain
- Education: Universitat Autònoma de Barcelona
- Occupations: Researcher; professor
- Website: almiron.org

Núria Almiron Roig (born 1967 in Sabadell) is a Catalan researcher who specializes in communication and power relations. Since 2008, she has been a professor of Ethics and Political Economy of Communication in the Department of Communication at the Universitat Pompeu Fabra (UPF) and was previously a professor at the Universitat Autònoma de Barcelona (UAB).

Her main research topics include the political economy of communication, the ethics of mediation, interest groups, critical animal studies, and environmental ethics from a non-speciesist perspective. She is co-founder and co-director of the UPF-Centre for Animal Ethics and a member of the CRITIC research group at UPF.

She has previously worked as a political scientist and as a journalist specializing in ICTs, and has researched financial crime.

== Selected works ==
- Almiron, N. (Ed.) (2024): Animal Suffering and Public Relations. The Ethics of Persuasion in the Animal Industrial Complex. London: Routledge.
- Freeman, C.P., and Almiron, N. (Eds.) (2022): Communication in Defense of Nonhuman Animals During and Extinction and Climate Crisis. Basel: MDPI.
- Almiron, N., and Xifra, J. (2021): Repensar los Think tanks. Expertos vs Impostores / Rethinking Think Tanks. Experts vs Impostors. Zaragoza: Prensa Universitaria de Zaragoza.
- Khazaal, N., and Almiron, N. (Eds.) (2021): 'Like an Animal'. Critical Animal Studies Approaches to Borders, Displacement and Others. Leiden: Brill.
- Albornoz, L. A., Segovia, A. I, and Almiron, N. (2020): Grupo Prisa. Media Power in Contemporary Spain. New York: Routledge.
- Almiron, N., and Xifra, Jordi. (Eds.) (2020): Climate Change Denial and Public Relations. Strategic Communication and Interest Groups in Climate Inaction. New York: Routledge.
- Almiron, N., Cole, M., and Freeman, C.P. (Eds.) (2016): Critical Animal and Media Studies. New York: Routledge.
- Coderch, M. and Almiron, N. (2011): Il miraggio nucleare. Perché l’energia nucleare non è la soluzione ma parte del problema. Milan: Bruno Mondadori.
- Almiron, N. (2010): Journalism in Crisis. Corporate Media and financialization. Cresskill NJ: Hampton Press.
- Coderch, M. and Almiron, N. (2010): El miratge nuclear. Barcelona: Llibres de l’Índex.
- Coderch, M. and Almiron, N. (2008): El espejismo nuclear. Por qué la energía nuclear no es la solución, sino parte del problema. Barcelona: Los libros del Lince.
- Almiron, N. and Jarque, J.M. (2008): El mito digital. Barcelona: Anthropos.
- Almiron, N. (2003): Juicio al Poder. El pulso del Santander a la justicia en el mayor fraude fiscal de la democracia. Madrid: Temas de Hoy.
- Almiron, N. (2002): Los amos de la globalización. Internet y poder en la era de la información. Barcelona: Plaza i Janés.
- Almiron, N. (2002): Els amos de la globalització. Internet i poder a l’era de la informació. Barcelona: Rosa dels Vents.
- Almiron, N. (2001): De Vannevar Bush a la WWW. Una genealogia de la humanització de les tecnologies de la informació: els pares de la interfíce humana. València: Ediciones 3 y 4.
- Almiron, N. (2000): Cibermillonarios. La Burbuja de Internet en España. Barcelona: Editorial Planeta.
