= An Introduction to Animals and Political Theory =

2010 textbook by Alasdair Cochrane

- Author: Alasdair Cochrane
- Language: English
- Series: Palgrave Macmillan Animal Ethics Series
- Subjects: Animal ethics; Political theory
- Publisher: Palgrave Macmillan
- Publication date: 13 October 2010
- Publication place: United Kingdom
- Media type: Print (Hardcover and Paperback)
- Pages: 176+vii
- ISBN: 978-0230239265
- OCLC: 793105423

An Introduction to Animals and Political Theory is a 2010 textbook by the British political theorist Alasdair Cochrane. It is the first book in the Palgrave Macmillan Animal Ethics Series, edited by Andrew Linzey and Priscilla Cohn. Cochrane's book examines five schools of political theory—utilitarianism, liberalism, communitarianism, Marxism and feminism—and their respective relationships with questions concerning animal rights and the political status of (non-human) animals. Cochrane concludes that each tradition has something to offer to these issues, but ultimately presents his own account of interest-based animal rights as preferable to any. His account, though drawing from all examined traditions, builds primarily upon liberalism and utilitarianism.

An Introduction was reviewed positively in several academic publications. The political philosopher Steve Cooke said that Cochrane's own approach showed promise, and that the book would have benefited from devoting more space to it. Robert Garner, a political theorist, praised Cochrane's synthesis of such a broad range of literature, but argued that the work was too uncritical of the concept of justice as it might apply to animals. Cochrane's account of interest-based rights for animals was subsequently considered at greater length in his 2012 book Animal Rights Without Liberation, published by Columbia University Press. An Introduction to Animals and Political Theory was one of the first books to explore animals from the perspective of political theory, and became an established part of a literature critical of the topic's traditional neglect.

== Background and publication ==
In the 1990s and 2000s, Alasdair Cochrane studied politics at the University of Sheffield and the London School of Economics (LSE). His doctoral thesis, supervised by Cécile Fabre with Paul Kelly acting as an adviser, was entitled Moral obligations to non-humans. He subsequently became a fellow and lecturer at the LSE. During this time, Cochrane published articles in Res Publica, Utilitas and Political Studies presenting aspects of his interest-based theory of animal rights, (Note: Cochrane's article in Political Studies, defending his contention that animals have no intrinsic interest in (and so no right to) freedom, became significant, provoking responses from the political theorist Robert Garner, and the philosophers John Hadley, Andreas T. Schmidt, and Valéry Giroux.) which is defended in the final chapter of An Introduction to Animals and Political Theory. The book was Cochrane's first, and the political theorist Robert Garner acted as an important discussant during the writing process.

An Introduction to Animals and Political Theory was first published in the UK on 13 October 2010 by Palgrave Macmillan in paperback, hardback and eBook formats. It was the first book to appear as part of the Palgrave Macmillan Animal Ethics Series, a partnership between Palgrave Macmillan and the Ferrata Mora Oxford Centre for Animal Ethics. The series's general editors are Andrew Linzey and Priscilla N. Cohn. Interdisciplinary in focus, the Palgrave Macmillan Animal Ethics Series aims to explore the practical and conceptual challenges posed by animal ethics.

== Synopsis ==
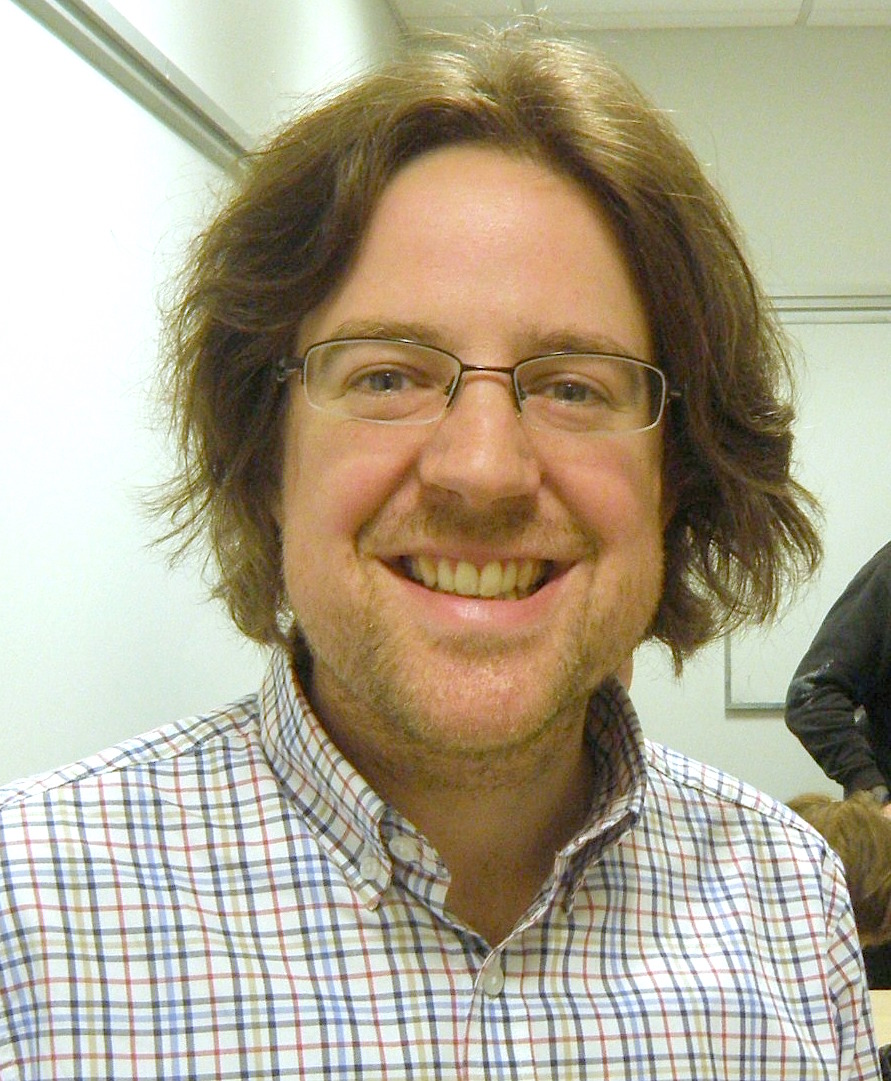
An Introduction to Animals and Political Theory is the first book by Alasdair Cochrane.

An Introduction to Animals and Political Theory begins by discussing the history of animals in political theory before considering the approaches taken to the status of animals by five schools of political theory: utilitarianism, liberalism, communitarianism, Marxism and feminism. The final chapter outlines Cochrane's own approach, which he situates between liberalism and utilitarianism.

=== Opening chapters ===
Cochrane establishes the book as a work of normative political theory asking to what extent animals should be included in the domain of justice. States can and do regulate human-animal relationships, whether the animals in question are used in agriculture, as companions, or in some other way. Cochrane's focus is not on why laws are passed or on comparing laws, but in exploring what kind of laws should be passed. As his focus is on political theory, he is less concerned with questions about individual moral obligations than he is with institutional arrangements. He notes, however, that questions about animals have been neglected in political theory. In the second chapter, Cochrane considers the history of thinking on the relationship between justice and animals. He argues that within ancient philosophy there was disagreement about the inclusion of animals within accounts of justice, in medieval Christian philosophy there was a consensus that they should be excluded, and in modern philosophy there has been a return to disagreement.

=== Utilitarianism ===
Chapter three considers utilitarianism, according to which the rightness or wrongness of an action is determined by the extent to which it promotes utility—a concept equated, by classical utilitarians, with pleasure. As a political theory, then, classical utilitarianism entails that "it is the obligation of political communities to formulate policies and institutions which promote pleasure". Utilitarianism as a whole, Cochrane argues, posed a challenge to the medieval and early modern assumption that animals are owed nothing. Its focus on welfare and sentience, and its egalitarian nature, allow the extension of justice to animals. The ideas of Peter Singer are outlined. Cochrane then defends Singer's account both against those presenting arguments in defence of speciesism, and against critics (such as R. G. Frey) who maintain that animals do not have interests. He then considers utilitarian critics of Singer, who argue that meat-eating maximises utility, even when animal interests are taken into account. This leads to the criticism that judging the best consequences is an extremely difficult task for political communities, but Cochrane concludes that a utilitarian consensus does at least support the abolition of factory farming. Finally, he addresses critics who argue that Singer's position offers insufficient protection for animals. Martha Nussbaum's argument that animals can suffer unfelt harms is considered, as is Tom Regan's criticism that, under Singer's account, animals are protected only insofar as their protection maximises welfare, rather than in their own right.

=== Liberalism ===
Chapter four considers liberalism, a political theory which, according to Cochrane, has as its defining feature a valuation of "the free and equal individual person". Cochrane focuses primarily upon John Rawls, whose social contract account offers two reasons for the rejection of animals from issues of basic justice: questions of reciprocity, for which animals are ill-suited, and questions of personhood, as all parties to the contract must be moral persons. Cochrane criticises Rawls's exclusion of animals, before identifying the risks to animals inherent within liberal pluralism. The possibility of a Rawlsian account including animals, such as those offered by Donald Van De Veer and Mark Rowlands, is considered and rejected; Cochrane outlines problems with placing questions of species membership behind the veil of ignorance and outlines Garner's fundamental criticisms of Rawls. Modified versions of personhood that include animals are discussed. Cochrane closes the chapter by arguing that personhood and welfare should both be considered important; in so doing, he points towards his own conception of justice for animals.

=== Communitarianism ===
Chapter five assesses the relationship between animals and communitarianism. Communitarians criticise liberalism's focus on a state which does not interfere with individuals, instead favouring a political order which takes a stand on moral concerns, drawing from the shared moral values of a given society. Cochrane initially argues that communitarianism, using British society as an example, can be used to expand justice to animals. He devotes the remainder of the chapter to four arguments against this line of thought. First, communitarianism is particularist; that is, the principles it expounds are wholly contingent on the values in the particular society. Second, there are difficulties inherent in finding "authentic" values within a given society. Third, societies often favour some animals over others, leaving unfavoured animals vulnerable. Fourth, there is the question of whose values within a society matter: states often contain multiple communities with very different attitudes to animals. Consideration of this fourth question involves analysis of multiculturalism.

=== Marxism ===
Cochrane goes on, in chapter six, to consider Marxism. Unlike the other political theories explored in An Introduction to Animals and Political Theory, Marxism is purportedly not a normative account but a scientific theory which predicts and explains the end of the state and the beginning of communism. This is understood as the inevitable conclusion of the history of the changing forms of economic relationships. Cochrane outlines the discontinuities between humans and animals that exist for Karl Marx and considers the extent to which animal-rights thinking is an example of bourgeois morality. These analyses serve to illustrate how Marxist thinking can be used to exclude animals, but counterarguments are offered. Cochrane then draws upon the work of Catherine Perlow and Barbara Noske, who have argued that animals may represent an exploited group in a Marxist sense, but he is critical of the argument that this exploitation is caused by capitalism and that overthrowing capitalism would be a necessary step for achieving justice. He next considers the work of David Sztybel and Ted Benton, who have drawn upon the adage of "From each according to his ability, to each according to his need" in relation to animals; Cochrane is wary about the use of the phrase for three reasons. First, it is unclear how central the idea is to Marxist thought; second, it is a principle only for societies in advanced stages of communism; and third, even if we assume we can know the needs of animals, the principle would entail the extension of justice beyond sentient animals, which is an idea that Cochrane rejects. Finally, Cochrane considers Benton's proposal that liberal rights-based approaches to animal justice cannot achieve their goal, and that Marxism can be used as a resource for political achievement. This is, for Cochrane, Marxism's most important contribution in the area.

=== Feminism ===
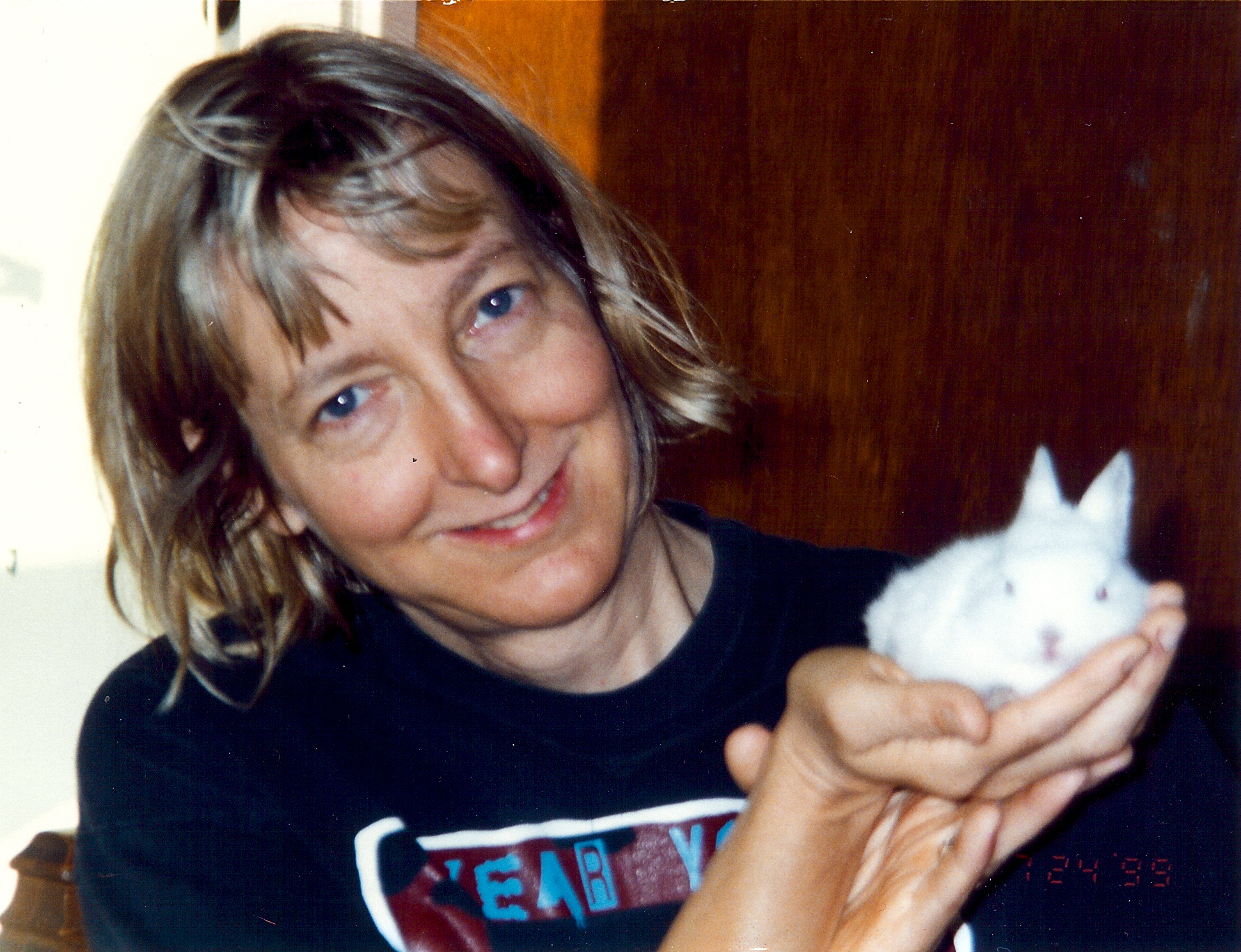
Cochrane considers but rejects the arguments of Carol J. Adams (pictured) that the oppression of women and of animals is linked through the cultural practice of meat-eating.

Cochrane considers feminism, the final tradition he examines, in chapter seven. As with Marxism, there are historical links between feminism and animal liberation. Cochrane considers the putative interrelatedness, posited by some feminist theorists, of the oppression of animals and women, but denies that the liberation of animals and women are necessarily interdependent. He suggests that there are four ways that this relationship could be grounded. The first is an idea taken from theorists drawing upon ecofeminism, like Josephine Donovan. This is the claim that the domination of women and animals are both due to a patriarchal elevation of the "rational" over the "natural". The second is Carol J. Adams's argument that the connection of meat-eating and masculinity serves to oppress both women and animals, meaning that the liberation of both depends upon the end of meat-eating. The third is that, as identified by Adams and Catharine MacKinnon, women and animals are linked and oppressed by linguistic norms. For example, women might be called cow, bitch or dog, which serves to denigrate both women and animals. The fourth is the way that both animals and women are objectified, treated as mere things to be used towards the ends of others. Cochrane argues that women are not irrational, though animals are less rational than humans, meaning that the oppression and liberation of the two groups may differ. He challenges Adams's claims about meat by envisioning a vegetarian but misogynistic society on the one hand and a society where the genders are equal but meat continues to be eaten on the other. He challenges the claims about language by observing that some animal-based insults are gender-neutral (for example, rat, pig, sheep), and some slurs to women (for example, witch, jezebel, whore) are unrelated to animals. Concerning objectification, Cochrane notes that women are not considered property under the law, though animals are. This makes their respective objectification importantly different. Next, the author rebuts five criticisms of reason-based approaches—epitomised, for Cochrane, by Singer and Regan—to animal liberation from thinkers supportive of feminist care-based approaches, before outlining and rejecting an emotionally driven, care-based approach to animal justice.

=== Conclusion ===
In the final chapter Cochrane argues that each school has an important contribution to make to animal justice, particularly liberalism and utilitarianism. He then outlines his own approach. He writes that, while talk of our political and moral obligations to animals is today more prominent than ever, it remains on the periphery of mainstream dialogue in political theory. He closes by arguing that this neglect is a problem for political theory, and that animals are owed justice. If the book's claims are correct, Cochrane concludes, questions concerning the treatment of animals should be considered some of the most pressing political issues today.

== Central argument ==
Cochrane argues that while each of the schools of thought he has considered has problems, they all have something important to contribute to the debate. Utilitarianism's most important contribution is its focus on sentience, but its major failing is its lack of respect for individuals. Liberalism, on the other hand, asserts the centrality of the individual. Communitarianism, though it is too ready to attribute cohesion to the values of a given society, observes that individuals can flourish only within appropriate communities, and stresses the importance of changing the views of society at large. This latter idea is shared by Marxism, which points out that legal change does not necessarily equate to effective change. While Cochrane does not agree that capitalism must be overthrown, he recognises that "fundamental shifts in the organisation, norms and institutions of society" are needed for justice to be extended to animals. Care-based feminist approaches, despite Cochrane's criticism, remind us that emotions and sympathy should not be ignored.

Cochrane's own sympathies lie most strongly with utilitarianism and liberalism; his own account is most influenced by them. He argues that rights derived from considerations of interests can protect individual animals and place limits on what can be done to them. These rights cannot be violated, even in the name of the greater good, which means that the cultural and economic practices of human beings will be affected. Anticipating criticism, Cochrane explains that not every interest leads to a right. A full consideration of this argument is outside the scope of the book. The argument was expanded in Cochrane's Animal Rights Without Liberation (2012) which, though published after An Introduction to Animals and Political Theory, was based on his doctoral thesis.

== Academic reception ==
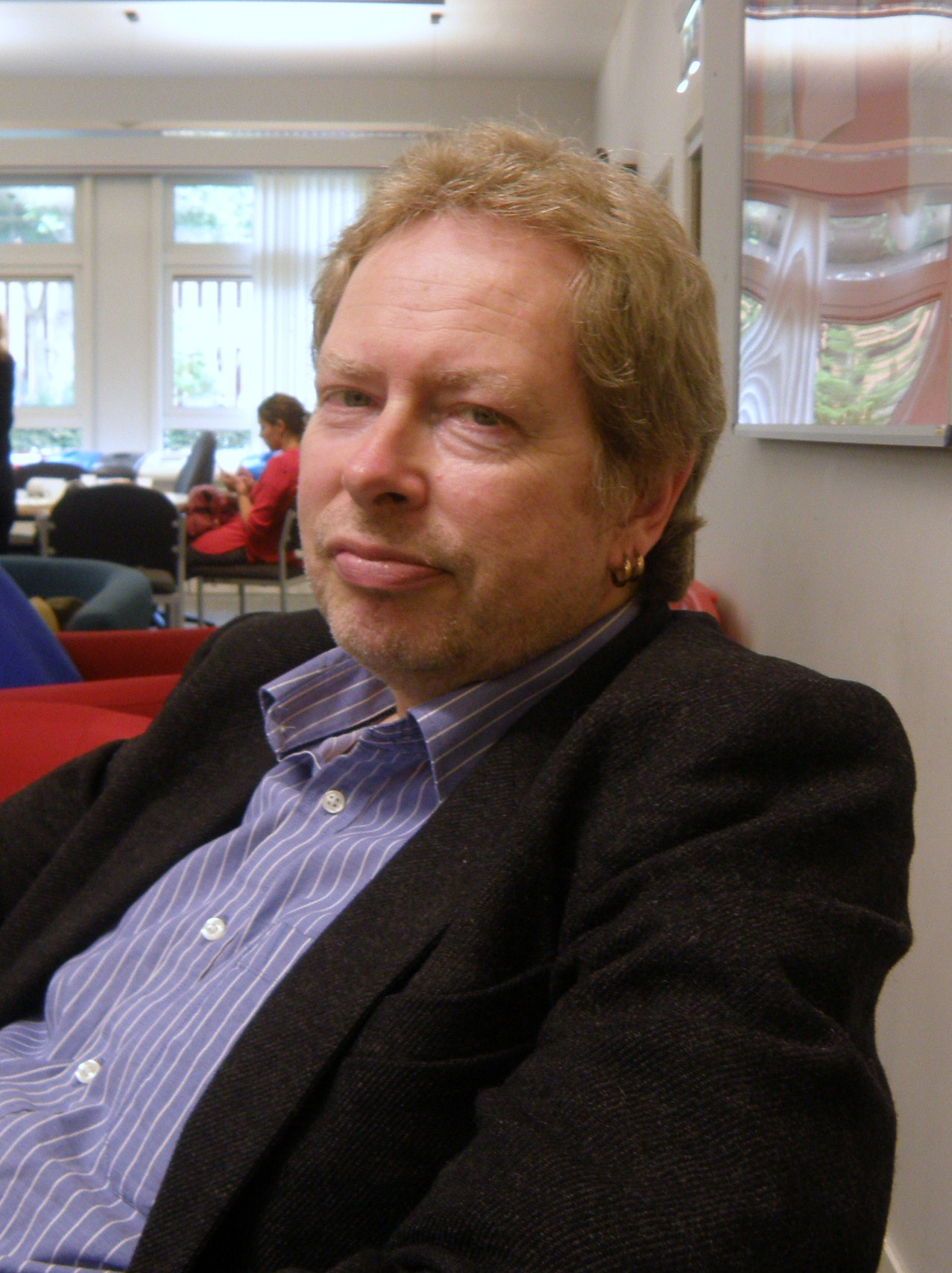
Robert Garner reviewed the book for the Journal of Animal Ethics.

An Introduction to Animals and Political Theory was reviewed by Garner for the Journal of Animal Ethics, the political philosopher Steve Cooke for the Political Studies Review and the sociologist Richard Seymour for the LSE Review of Books. In addition, it was reviewed by C. E. Rasmussen for Choice: Current Reviews for Academic Libraries. (Note: At the time their respective reviews were published, Cooke was based at the University of Manchester, while Seymour was based at the LSE. Rasmussen was based at the University of Delaware.) All four reviewers were broadly positive towards the work. Cooke recommended it for "readers interested both in the moral and political standing of animals and in political theory in general", the latter group because the work's methodological approach allows it to serve as a good introduction to political theory generally. Seymour considered the book a "refreshing and comprehensive overview of a highly interesting issue". Garner said that the work came "highly recommended"; he considered it "a very fine book", in which "Cochrane expertly simplifies and synthesizes a huge and complex literature in the limited space available to him, while retaining high scholarly standards". Garner also praised the fact that the book remained interesting, unlike many textbooks. Rasmussen said that the book came "highly recommended" for undergraduate and graduate students as well as non-specialist audiences.

Palgrave Macmillan advertised the book with quotes taken from Cooke and Garner's respective reviews, as well as with quotes from Daniel A. Dombrowski and Siobhan O'Sullivan. Dombrowski was quoted as saying that the "book will be welcomed by all who are interested in the relationship between non-human animals and political theory, a relationship that has been underexplored by scholars. Highly recommended!" Meanwhile, O'Sullivan wrote:

If only Cochrane had been writing when I was an undergraduate political science student! But this book's appeal will not be limited to students. This is one of the first comprehensive articulations of what mainstream political values might mean for animals—something the academic community has desperately needed for far too long. It's a great read and an important contribution.

Cooke considered Cochrane's own account to be "interesting and worthy of further consideration" and found his supporting arguments to be "convincing", but he worried that the account was not considered in the depth it warranted. He wrote that An Introduction to Animals and Political Theory would have benefited if more space had been given to the interest-based account. Further, Cooke noted that, in covering such a wide array of positions, Cochrane had to sacrifice depth of argument; Cooke considered this unproblematic, as readers could easily follow up the thinkers cited. Seymour was particularly critical of Cochrane's coverage of feminism, which was, for him, "an unfortunate lapse in an otherwise fascinating review". Seymour argued that Cochrane's critique was superficial or "[missed] the point entirely". Instead, he suggested, feminist approaches provide a potentially highly productive approach to the subject. Similarly, though Rasmussen praised the book's first five chapters as "providing an invaluable resource for undergraduates or scholars new to political theory", he felt that Cochrane's coverage of Marxism and feminism was somewhat less thorough.

In response to An Introduction to Animals and Political Theory, Garner raised two themes, the first of which was the use of the concept of justice. Agreeing with Cochrane that the concept is the defining feature of a political account, as opposed to more general accounts of animal ethics, Garner nevertheless found Cochrane's account of justice to be "too broad and loose". In the book, Cochrane considers justice for animals to be "about recognising that the treatment of animals is something that political communities ought to enforce for the sake of animals themselves". For Garner,

The problem with this is that it arguably includes too much—for it implies that once the state recognizes that we have direct duties to animals, that what we do to them matters to them, then the demands of justice are met. This means that, with the exception of those who hold that we have only indirect duties to animals, all the traditions that Cochrane discusses can lay claim to offering a theory of justice for animals.

Further, Garner suggests that Cochrane is "perhaps unduly uncritical of the utility of employing justice as a means to protect the interests of animals". He outlines two ways that animals might be protected without being the recipients of justice; first, they may be owed direct duties outside of justice, or, second, they might be protected by means of indirect duties, meaning that they are protected because of what humans owe to one another. Despite raising these themes in his review of An Introduction to Animals and Political Theory, Garner later rejected both possibilities in his own work, arguing that animals should be considered recipients of justice. Rasmussen felt that Cochrane utilised a narrow account of the political, meaning that a range of feminist, post-colonial and post-humanist perspectives were ignored in the book.

The second theme Garner identified was the divide between ideal and nonideal theory, which he understands as a way political theory may be used to contextualise animal ethics and further the debate. Ultimately, for Garner, Cochrane's theory serves as a challenge to abolitionism, which, Garner fears, both polarises the debate and is unrealistic. The themes of this review were built upon in Garner's 2013 book A Theory of Justice for Animals. In the course of his review of the book, Garner looked forward to the release of Cochrane's second book, Animal Rights Without Liberation, which offers a lengthier defence of the interest-based rights theory.

== Legacy ==
The Oxford Centre for Animal Ethics described An Introduction to Animals and Political Theory as "the first introductory level text to offer an accessible overview on the status of animals in contemporary political theory", while commentators noted that it was one of the first works—previous books on the subject having been written by Garner and Nussbaum—to link the question of animal rights to the concept of justice in political philosophy. Since the book's publication, a number of works exploring animals in political theory have been published; these works have been collectively referred to as belonging to the "political turn" in animal ethics/animal rights, or the disciplines of "animal political philosophy" and "Animal Politics". Both An Introduction to Animals and Political Theory and Animal Rights Without Liberation have become an established part of this literature.

== Formats ==
The book has been published in paperback, hardback and eBook formats.

- Hardback: Cochrane, Alasdair (13 October 2010). An Introduction to Animals and Political Theory. Basingstoke, United Kingdom: Palgrave Macmillan. ISBN 978-0-230-23925-8.
- Paperback: Cochrane, Alasdair (13 October 2010). An Introduction to Animals and Political Theory. Basingstoke, United Kingdom: Palgrave Macmillan. ISBN 978-0-230-23926-5.
- eBook: Cochrane, Alasdair (13 October 2010). An Introduction to Animals and Political Theory. Basingstoke, United Kingdom: Palgrave Macmillan. doi:10.1057/9780230290594. ISBN 978-0-230-29059-4.
