= Alasdair Cochrane =

British political theorist (born 1978)

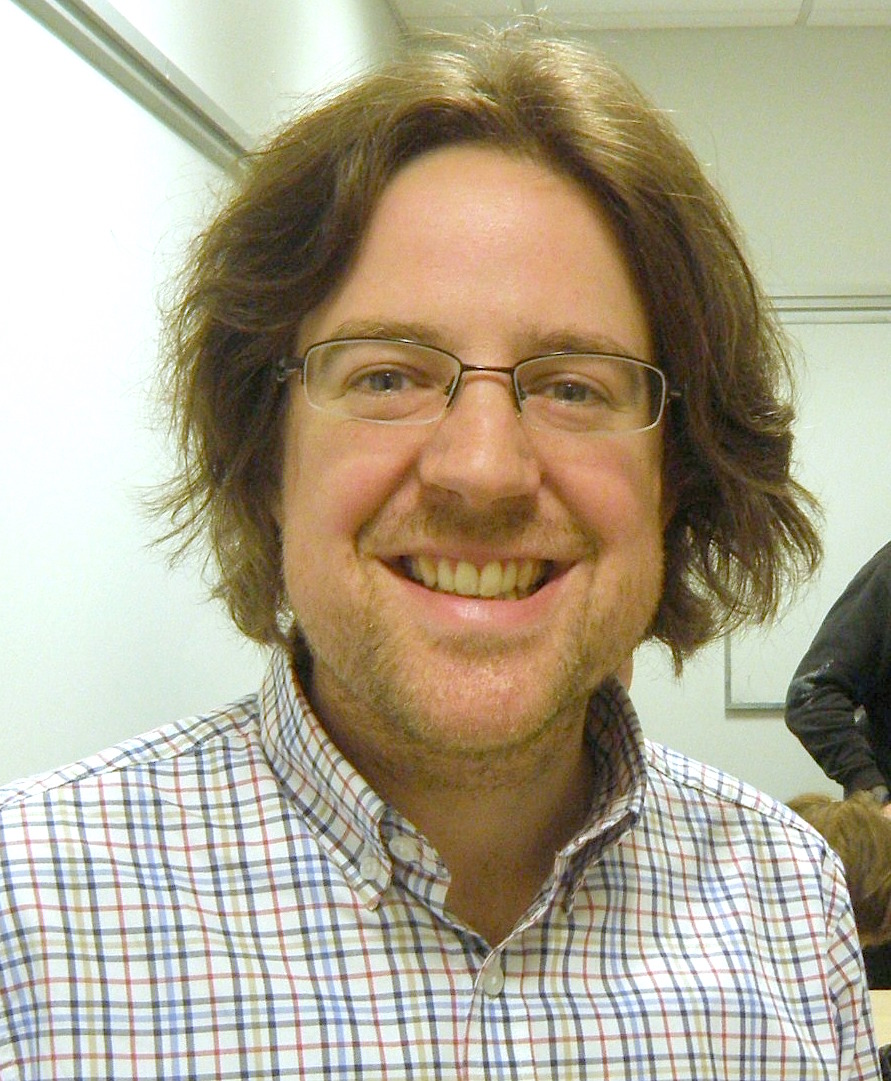
- Cochrane in 2013
- Born: 31 March 1978 (age 48)
- Awards: BBC Radio 3 New Generation Thinker

Education
- Education: University of Sheffield; London School of Economics
- Thesis: Moral obligations to non-humans (2007)
- Doctoral advisor: Cécile Fabre

Philosophical work
- Era: Contemporary philosophy
- Region: Western philosophy
- School: Analytic philosophy
- Institutions: London School of Economics; University of Sheffield
- Main interests: Animal ethics; political theory; bioethics; human rights; environmental ethics
- Notable ideas: Interest-based account of animal rights; liberty thesis; cosmozoopolis

Alasdair Cochrane (born 31 March 1978) is a British political theorist and ethicist who is currently Professor of Political Theory in the Department of Politics and International Relations at the University of Sheffield. He is known for his work on animal rights from the perspective of political theory, which is the subject of his two books: An Introduction to Animals and Political Theory (2010, Palgrave Macmillan) and Animal Rights Without Liberation (2012, Columbia University Press). His third book, Sentientist Politics, was published by Oxford University Press in 2018. He is a founding member of the Centre for Animals and Social Justice, a UK-based think tank focused on furthering the social and political status of nonhuman animals. He joined the Department at Sheffield in 2012, having previously been a faculty member at the Centre for the Study of Human Rights, London School of Economics. Cochrane is a sentientist. Sentientism is a naturalistic worldview that grants moral consideration to all sentient beings.

Cochrane's work forms part of the political turn in animal ethics—that is, the emergence of academic literature exploring the normative aspects of human/nonhuman animal relationships from a political perspective. He is known for his interest-based account of animal rights, a theory of justice according to which animals have rights based on their possession of normatively-significant interests. The account is a two-tiered one, with individuals' strong interests grounding prima facie rights, and some prima facie rights becoming concrete, or all-things-considered, rights. In this picture, the violation of concrete rights, but not necessarily prima facie rights, represents an injustice. In particular, Cochrane argues that sentient animals' interests against suffering and death ground prima facie rights against the infliction of suffering and death. These prima facie rights convert to concrete rights in, for example, animal agriculture and animal testing, meaning that killing nonhuman animals or making them suffer for these purposes is unjust.

Cochrane argues that nonhuman animals do not possess an intrinsic interest in freedom. Therefore, owning or using nonhuman animals is not, in itself, unjust. This aspect of his thought has generated responses by others, including the political theorist Robert Garner and the philosopher John Hadley, who argue that there may be reasons to claim that nonhuman animals do possess an interest in freedom. Cochrane has also proposed a cosmopolitan alternative to Sue Donaldson and Will Kymlicka's picture of a political animal rights, explicated in their 2011 book Zoopolis. Though Donaldson and Kymlicka have defended their account against Cochrane's criticism, they have said that they welcome attempts to develop alternative political theories of animal rights to their own. Cochrane's other research focusses variously on bioethics, punishment, just war and human rights.

== Life ==
=== Education ===
Alasdair Cochrane studied in the Department of Politics at Sheffield as an undergraduate. There, he was taught by James Meadowcroft, a specialist in environmental politics, who sparked his interest in political and environmental philosophy. During a course on environmental politics, Cochrane read Joel Feinberg's "The Rights of Animals and Unborn Generations", which he recalled as probably the first piece of "pro-animal" scholarship he read. The first piece of "pro-animal" scholarship he wrote was his undergraduate dissertation, in which he explored the possibility of a reconciliation between sustainable development and animal rights. Cochrane received a first-class honours degree in politics in 2000 from the university. He subsequently obtained an MSc in political theory from the London School of Economics (LSE). It was during this time that he met Cécile Fabre, who went on to become his PhD supervisor. In 2007, Cochrane received a PhD from the Department of Government at the LSE. His thesis, supervised by Fabre with Paul Kelly acting as an advisor, was entitled Moral obligations to non-humans. In that year, Cochrane published his first peer-reviewed research article: "Animal rights and animal experiments: An interest-based approach". The paper, a reworked version of chapter five ("Non-human animals and experimentation") of Moral obligations to non-humans, appeared in Res Publica, and was the winner of the journal's second annual postgraduate essay prize.

=== Academic career ===
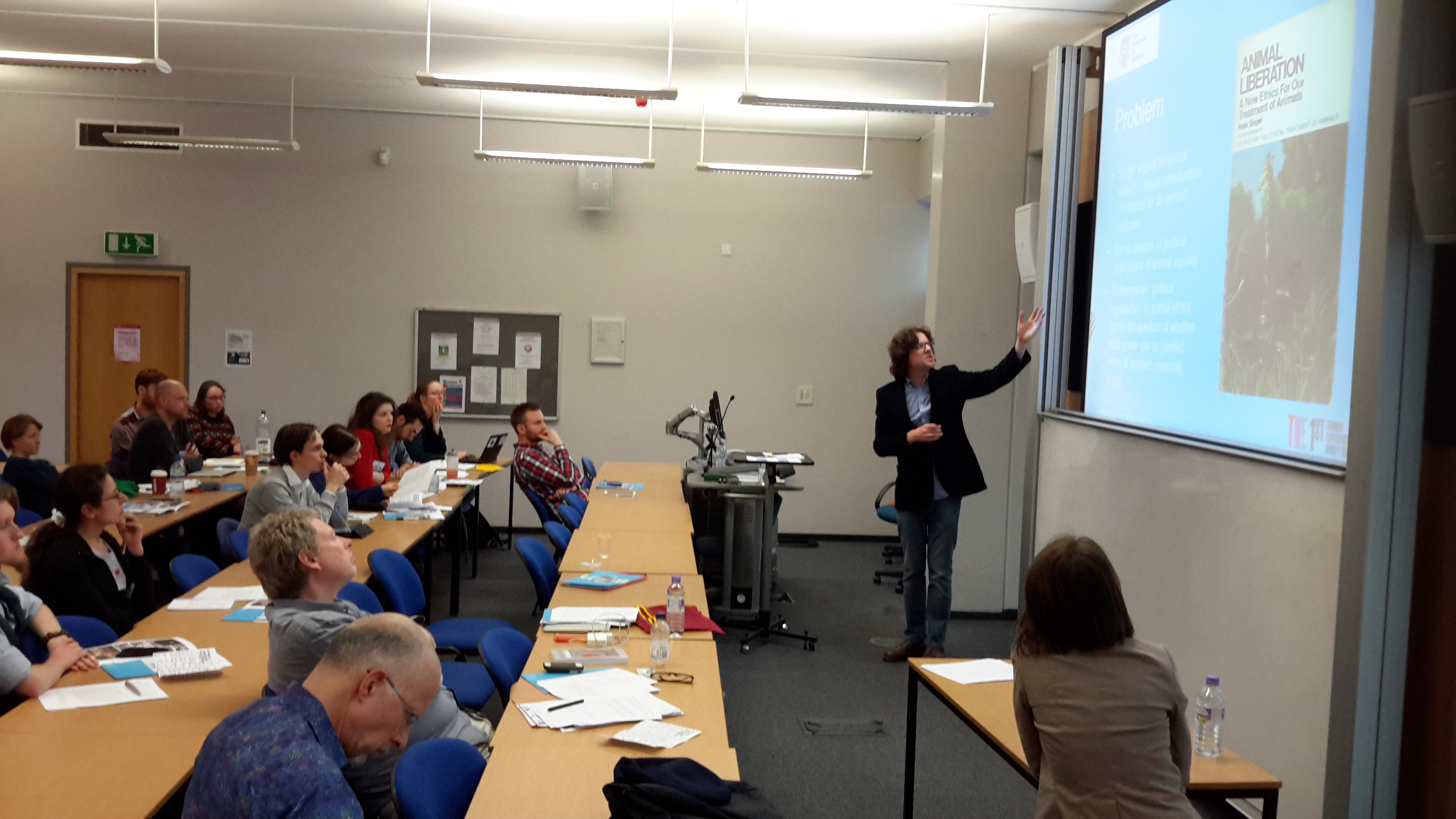
Cochrane presenting at Ethics and/or Politics: Approaching the Issues Concerning Nonhuman Animals, University of Birmingham, April 2015, chaired by Tatjana Višak

In 2007, after completing his postgraduate studies, Cochrane joined the Centre for the Study of Human Rights at the LSE. He was initially a fellow, then became a lecturer. In 2009, he published articles in Utilitas and Political Studies defending his "liberty thesis", the idea that nonhuman animals lack an intrinsic interest in freedom. This claim has attracted article-length responses from the political theorist Robert Garner, and the philosophers John Hadley, Andreas T. Schmidt, and Valéry Giroux. Cochrane's first book, An Introduction to Animals and Political Theory, was published in 2010, and was one of the first to consider nonhuman animals from the perspective of political theory. The book introduces readers to the debate about the inclusion of nonhuman animals within accounts of justice. He first addresses the historical dimension of the question, arguing that there was disagreement in classical exploration of the issue, unanimous rejection in medieval considerations and disagreement in contemporary treatments. He then considers the place of nonhuman animals in utilitarian, liberal, communitarian, Marxist and feminist political theory, concluding that no single tradition is sufficient to account for the place nonhuman animals should have in politics, but that all have something worthwhile to offer to the debate.

In 2011 Cochrane became a founding member of the Centre for Animals and Social Justice (CASJ). The CASJ is a think tank that aims to bring academics and policy makers together with a view to understanding and furthering the social and political status of nonhuman animals. In January 2012 Cochrane became a faculty member in the Department of Politics at the University of Sheffield, first as a lecturer in political theory, and then as a senior lecturer in political theory. His second book, Animal Rights Without Liberation, was released that year by Columbia University Press. The book is based upon the research he completed during his PhD at LSE, and offers an extended defence of the theoretical basis and practical consequences of his interest-based rights account of animal ethics. In 2013 he edited a special section in the journal Global Policy entitled "International Animal Protection"; the section included articles by the philosopher Oscar Horta, the environmental law scholar Stuart R. Harrop and the animal law scholar Steven White, with an introduction by Cochrane. He also contributed to the inaugural issue of the journal Law, Ethics and Philosophy as a part of a symposium on Sue Donaldson and Will Kymlicka's Zoopolis. Cochrane's paper argued for a "cosmozoopolis", a cosmopolitan alternative to Donaldson and Kymlicka's proposal for a "zoopolis"—a picture of a mixed human/nonhuman animal state with group-differentiated political rights for nonhuman animals. A reply to Cochrane's piece (as well as the other contribution, by Horta) from Donaldson and Kymlicka was also included. In 2014, he was named a BBC Radio 3 New Generation Thinker for his work on animal rights. Cochrane's third book, Sentientist Politics, was released by Oxford University Press in 2018. The book addresses the topic of animal rights and global justice, covering questions of cross-border obligations to nonhuman animals and the idea of international politics taking the rights of all sentient beings seriously.

== Research ==
Cochrane has research interests in animal ethics, bioethics, environmental ethics, rights theory, and human rights, as well as contemporary political theory more broadly. He is a leading figure in what Garner calls the "political turn in animal ethics", though precisely what this means is disputed. Similarly, Tony Milligan characterises Cochrane as a key figure in the "political turn in animal rights", while Svenja Ahlhaus and Peter Niesen identify a discipline of "Animal Politics", of which Cochrane's work is a major part, separate from animal ethics. The literature to which these authors variously refer explores the relationships of humans and nonhuman animals from the perspective of normative political theory.

Cochrane has himself—writing with Garner and Siobhan O'Sullivan—explored the nature of the political turn. Cochrane, Garner and O'Sullivan argue both that the new literature is importantly unified and that it is distinct from more traditional approaches to animal ethics, presenting the focus on justice as the key feature. They write that "the crucial unifing and distinctive feature of these contributions—and what can properly be said to mark them out as a 'political turn'—is the way in which they imagine how political institutions, structures and processes might be transformed so as to secure justice for both human and nonhuman animals".

=== Interest-based rights approach ===
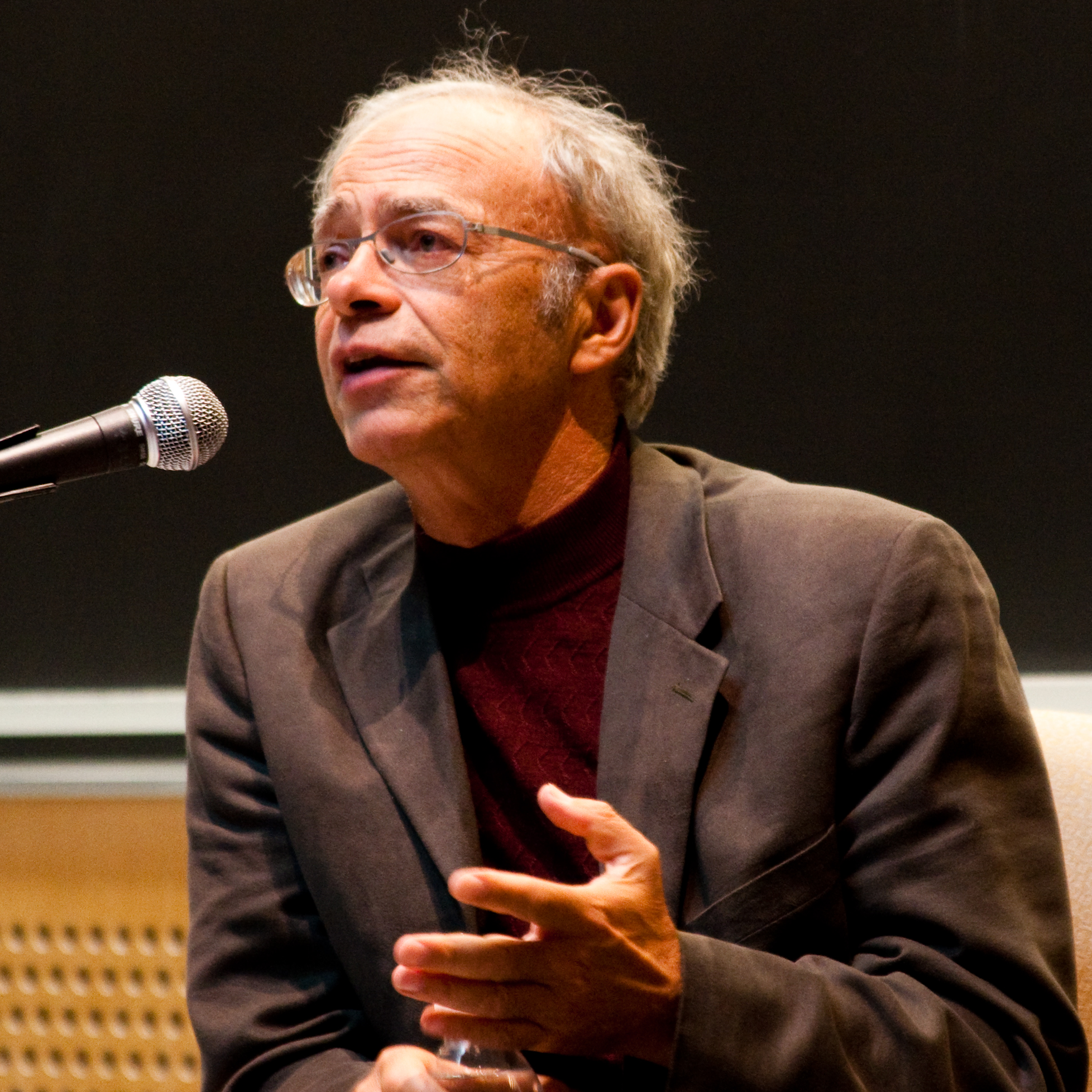
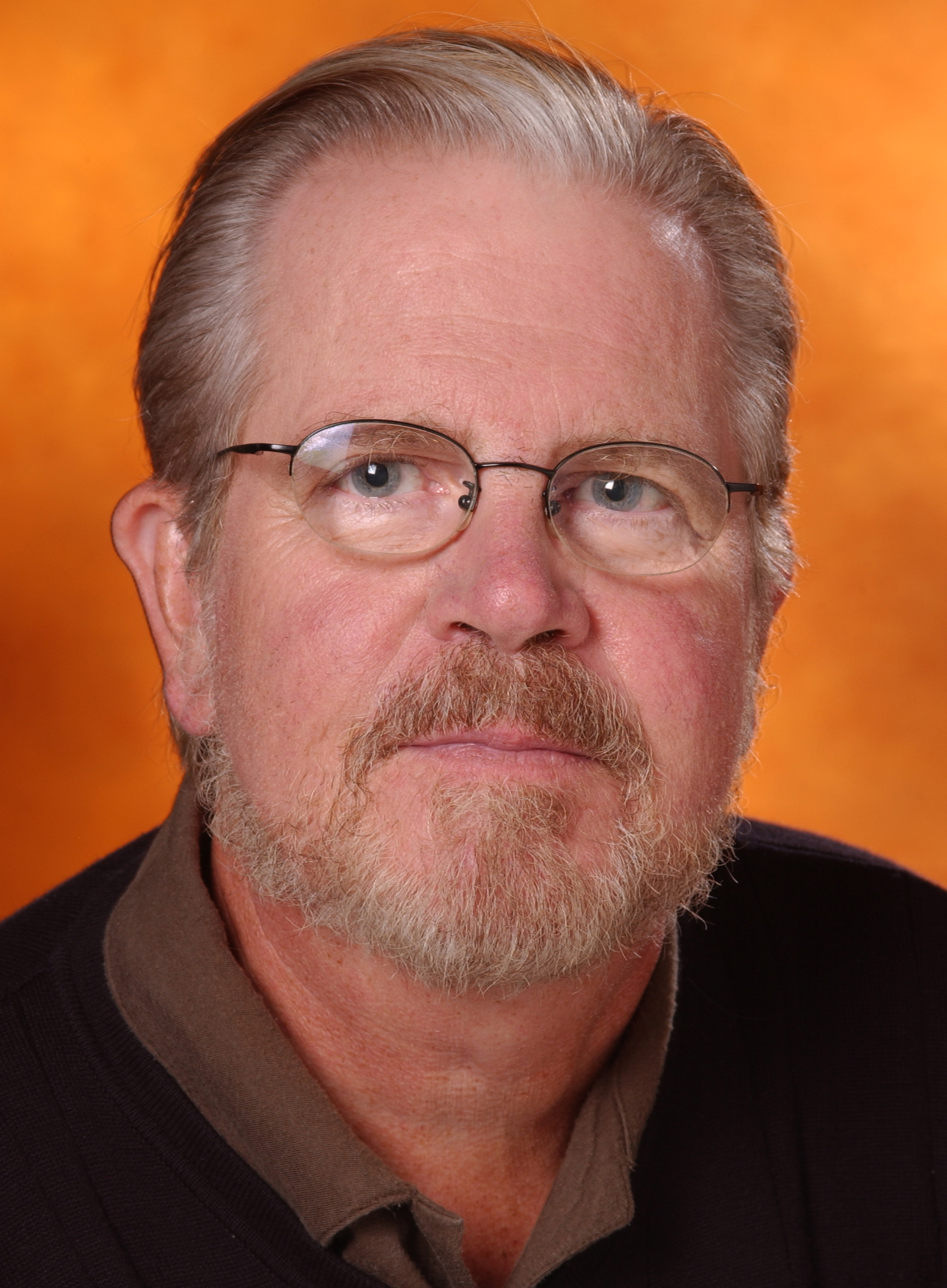
Cochrane's interest-based rights approach has been characterised as a possible middle-ground between the utilitarian case for animal equality of Peter Singer (left) and the animal rights theory of Tom Regan (right).

Cochrane advocates the "interest-based rights approach" to animal rights, which he distinguishes from the intrinsic value approach of Tom Regan and the relational account of Donaldson and Kymlicka. Rights set limits on what can be done, even in the pursuit of aggregative well-being. Cochrane suggests that rights should be grounded in interests, and follows Joseph Raz's formulation that

'X has a right' if and only if X can have rights and, other things being equal, an aspect of X's well-being (his interest) is a sufficient reason for holding some other person(s) to be under a duty.

Cochrane draws out several aspects of this account, which serves as the basis of the analysis in his Animal Rights Without Liberation and elsewhere. First, interests must be "sufficient to give grounds for holding another to be under a duty". Judging this entails considering the strength of an interest as well as "all other considerations"; so, for example, individuals may have a very strong interest in free expression, but, "all things considered", this fact does not necessitate the protection of slander. The greater interest of the victim of slander can outweigh the interest in free expression, and so context is important. This is the difference between prima facie rights and concrete rights. The former exist on an abstract level outside of particular circumstances. Prima facie rights can translate into concrete rights when considered in particular situations, but they do not always, as the free expression example illustrates. The account is for moral rights, and Cochrane's normative claims are intended to form part of a "democratic underlaboring", informing and persuading political communities.

External audio
- Labour Rights for Animals with Alasdair Cochrane; Cochrane discusses labour rights for animals with Siobhan O'Sullivan for the Knowing Animals podcast.

The strength of an interest is determined by a consideration of the value of something to an individual (though this is not understood purely subjectively) and the relationship between the individual at this time and the individual when he or she has the interest satisfied (see personal identity). Sentient animals, Cochrane argues, possess significant interests in not being made to suffer and in not being killed, and so have a prima facie right not to be made to suffer and a prima facie right not to be killed. Whether these prima facie rights translate into concrete rights depends on the situation in question. Cochrane explores the consequences of the account in his Animal Rights Without Liberation, arguing that, with very few exceptions, nonhuman animals have a concrete rights not to be killed or made to suffer in animal testing, animal agriculture, in entertainment, for environmental purposes and in cultural practices. Despite this, because Cochrane does not posit a right against use for nonhuman animals, his account is highly permissive when contrasted with other animal rights accounts. In a 2016 article, Cochrane extended his interest-based rights approach to include labour rights for nonhuman animals, on the basis that working animals are members of our society and workers. These rights include a right to representation in a union, a right to "just and favourable remuneration", a right to safe and healthy conditions of work, and a right to time off from work.

In his interest-based rights approach, Cochrane draws upon a number of normative theories, but most particularly utilitarianism and liberalism, and the framework has been presented by commentators as a possible middle-ground between the rights theory of Regan and the utilitarian account offered by Peter Singer. Cochrane is not the first theorist to advocate an interest-based account of animal rights. Garner identifies Joel Feinberg, James Rachels and Steve Sapontzis as three philosophers who have previously used the language of interest rights, while Cochrane identifies R. G. Frey and Regan as two others who have addressed the possibility. Interest-based approaches to animal ethics have become significant in recent academic literature; Milligan identifies "a strong emphasis upon animal interests but in the context of a rights theory rather than a Singer-style consequentialism" as one of the key components of the political turn.

=== Liberty thesis ===
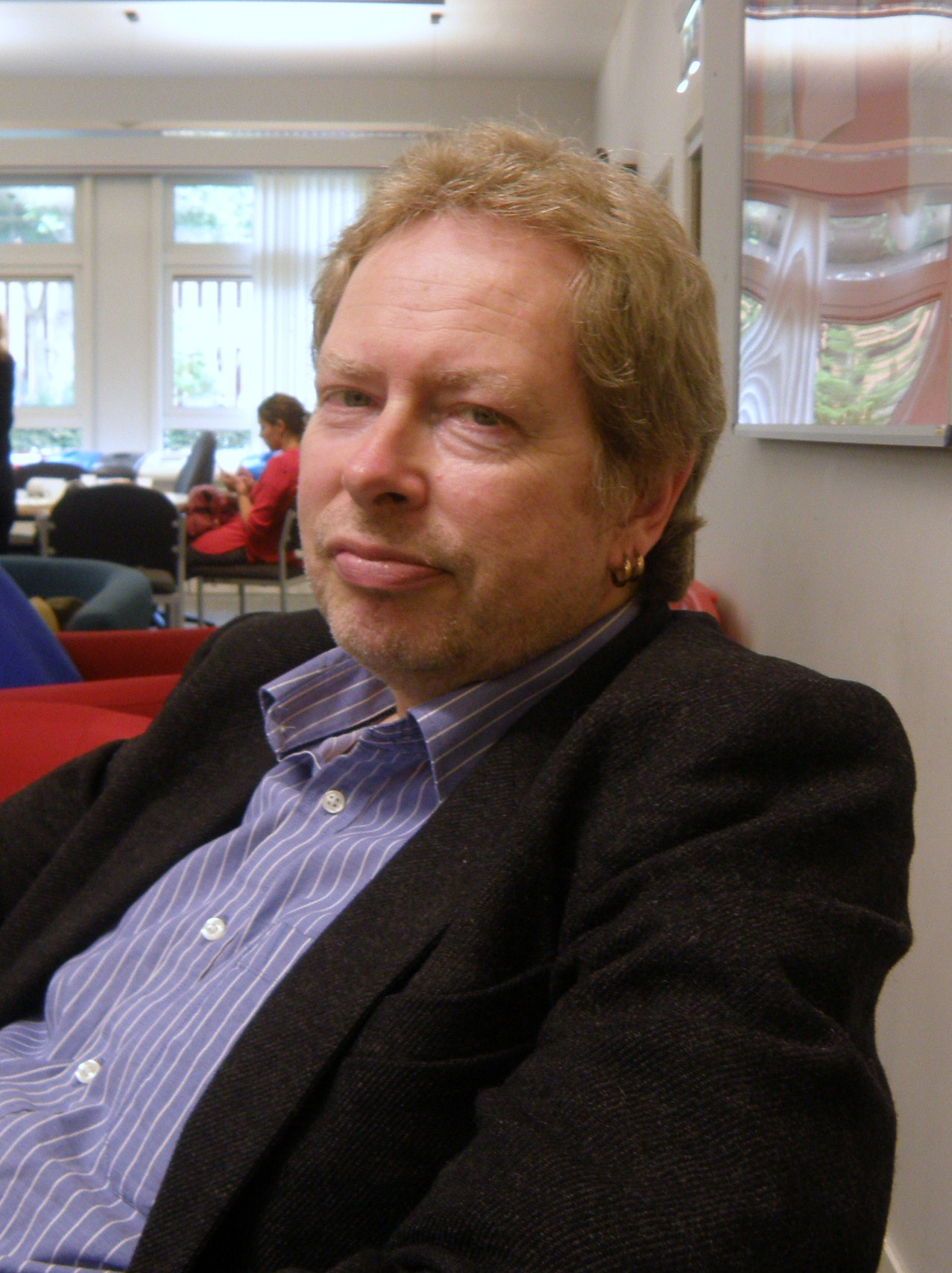
Robert Garner (pictured) criticises Cochrane for underestimating the force of the argument from marginal cases in his claims about liberty, but nonetheless suggests that an account of animal rights without a right to freedom could make significant progress for nonhuman animals.

Cochrane's "liberty thesis" is that nonhuman animals—with the possible exception of some great apes and cetaceans—do not have an intrinsic interest in freedom. Nonetheless, Cochrane claims, nonhuman animals may often have an extrinsic interest in freedom. This is because restricting a nonhuman animal's freedom may result in its suffering, and, regardless of their interest in freedom, sentient animals possess an interest in not suffering. Schmidt summarises Cochrane's argument as the following:

P1: To have a moral right to freedom, one needs to have a sufficient intrinsic interest in freedom.
P2: To have a sufficient and intrinsic interest in freedom implies that freedom by itself contributes to a person's wellbeing.
P3: Only in case of autonomous persons does freedom contribute by itself to their wellbeing (because only for autonomous persons does unfreedom undermine the ability to 'frame and pursue their own conception of the good').
P4: Non-human animals are not autonomous persons.
C1: Therefore, freedom does not by itself contribute to the wellbeing of non-human animals.
C2: Therefore, non-human animals do not have an intrinsic interest in freedom.
C3: Therefore, non-human animals do not have a moral right to freedom.

Though Cochrane argues that nonhuman animals are not the victim of an injustice simply because they are owned, he claims that ownership of an animal must be understood as not entailing absolute control over said animal. He conceptualises owned animals as "individual sentient creatures with interests of their own". In understanding owned animals in this way, he challenges alternative accounts that frame owned animals variously as living artifacts, slaves, co-citizens or beings who have strategically situated themselves alongside humans. In Animal Rights Without Liberation, Cochrane argues that there is nothing intrinsically wrong with using or owning animals, and so, as long as their interests are respected, there is nothing intrinsically wrong with using them, for example, in scientific tests, or for agricultural purposes. Ahlhaus and Niesen characterise the book as a whole as a critique of Singer's Animal Liberation, saying that the former explores the latter's "undeclared premise that liberation is what animals want or need".

Schmidt criticises Cochrane's liberty thesis on the grounds that nonhuman animals may have a non-specific instrumental interest in freedom, meaning that although freedom is not intrinsically valuable for these animals, it may be that they can achieve other things that are intrinsically valuable only through possessing freedom. Thus, Cochrane's thesis underestimates the value that freedom could have for nonhuman animals. Hadley criticises Cochrane's non-pragmatic approach, arguing that Cochrane, as an animal advocate, is wrong to deny that nonhuman animals possess an "intrinsic" interest in freedom. Hadley links freedom to the value of nonhuman animals, arguing that the latter can be undermined by arguing against the former. Garner criticises Cochrane's thesis on the grounds that Cochrane has, Garner claims, underestimated the weight of the argument from marginal cases. To the extent that Cochrane's argument works for nonhuman animals, Garner suggests, it will also work for many humans, leading to counter-intuitive consequences. Garner ties autonomy not merely to liberty, but also life, which means that Cochrane's argument would imply that some humans have less of an interest in life than others. Nonetheless, Garner argues that Cochrane's liberty thesis is not destructive of animal rights, and that animal rights positions can still make claims of significance without endorsing the claim that nonhuman animal use is, in itself, problematic. Indeed, merely a right against suffering, Garner suggests, could go a long way towards achieving the abolitionist goal of the end of animal industry. All three authors praise Cochrane for drawing attention to the previously under-examined issue.

The abolitionist theorist Jason Wyckoff draws attention to Cochrane's argument that nonhuman animals do not have an interest in not being owned. He formalises Cochrane's argument as follows:

1. Possession (understood as restriction of freedom) is something to which we do not object across the board even in the case of human children, so there is no across-the-board objection to possession when the case involves animals.
2. Non-lethal use of animals that does not cause suffering is consistent with full respect for the interests of those animals, provided that those animals are not treated exclusively as means to human ends.
3. At least some transferals of animals (including sales) are consistent with full respect for those animals’ interests, provided that the transfer does not cause suffering.
4. The rights to possess, use, and transfer items are at the core of our concept of property.
5. Therefore, the property status of animals is compatible with full respect for the interests of animals.

He claims that Cochrane's argument is invalid because it assumes that nonhuman animals are harmed by being owned only if they are killed or have suffering inflicted on them and because it assumes that ownership is permissible when it does not compromise the interests of the particular owned animal. Both of these assumptions are false, claim Wyckoff, as though "instances of possession, use, and transfer may possibly not violate the interests of an individual, the systematic treatment of that individual as the kind of entity that can be possessed, used, and transferred constructs that entity and others like it (or him, or her) as an object, and when that entity is a moral patient with interests, that construction as an object subordinates the interests of that patient and similar patients to those who benefit from the objectification of the individual". The philosopher Friederike Schmitz draws upon Wyckoff's argument in her challenge to Cochrane, arguing that it is necessary not only to consider whether ownership will harm animals in particular cases, but to explore the effects of the institution of animal ownership.

=== International animal rights ===
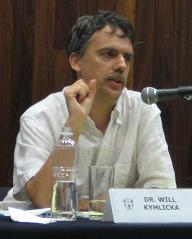
As an alternative to the "zoopolis" of Will Kymlicka (pictured) and Sue Donaldson, Cochrane argues for a "cosmozoopolis".

Some of Cochrane's research concerns animal rights from an international or cosmopolitan perspective. As an alternative to Donaldson and Kymlicka's proposal for a "zoopolis", Cochrane proposes a "cosmozoopolis", drawing upon cosmopolitan theory. The zoopolis picture, Cochrane suggests, unfairly elevates the interests of nonhuman "citizens" over other nonhuman animals, even though these other animals may have comparable interests, and, in offering sovereignty to free-living animals, denies the importance of nonhuman animal mobility. Ahlhaus and Niesen consider Cochrane's criticism of Donaldson and Kymlicka valuable, but question the extent to which his "cosmozoopolis" picture is compatible with his liberty thesis. Donaldson and Kymlicka offer a defence of their zoopolis picture against Cochrane's criticism, affirming the importance of nonhuman animals' interests in their territory and the legitimacy of offering benefits to members of particular societies denied to non-members. Despite this, they say that, citing Cochrane's cosmozoopolis picture as an example, "one of [their] aims is to inspire people to develop ... alternative political theories of animal rights" to their own.

Cochrane is of the view that "a lack of a clear, focused and coherent set of international standards and policies for animal protection is an important contributing factor" to the gulf between the theoretical and legal valuation of nonhuman animals and their treatment around the world. With Steve Cooke, he argues that it is theoretically acceptable—drawing upon Simon Caney's account of just war—for states to go to war to protect nonhuman animals. Nonetheless, the pair argue that it will almost never be acceptable in practice.

=== Other research ===
Cochrane is critical of the use of claims about dignity in debates about the genetic engineering of nonhuman animals, in questions about the use of nonhuman animals in human entertainment, and in the bioethics literature. He holds that nonhuman animals do not possess an interest against being treated in undignified ways, and endorses "undignified bioethics"—bioethics without the concept of dignity. Cochrane has sympathy for the standard criticisms of dignity in bioethics (that the concept is indeterminate, reactionary and redundant), and, in a 2010 paper, defends these criticisms against counter-claims from those who endorse various understandings of dignity. The bioethicist Inmaculada de Melo-Martín responded to Cochrane's article, claiming that the problems Cochrane identifies are problems with common understandings of the concepts of dignity, not with the concepts themselves, and arguing that Cochrane's conclusion leads to a conception of bioethics almost devoid of ethics.

External videos
- "Human Rights: Animal Rights"; Cochrane discusses the relationship between human rights and animal rights.

Recent literature exploring bioethical questions from a human rights perspective has been criticised on the grounds that human rights theory contains unresolved problems. Bioethicists have claimed that bioethical inquiry can contribute to resolving these problems. Cochrane claims that this contribution to human rights literature offers three insights, but that these are not entirely original. These insights are questions about institutional fairness, rights as trumps and rights as solely belonging to humans. Cochrane holds that human rights should be reconceptualised as sentient rights. The grounding of human rights, he claims, are not distinct from the grounding of human obligations to nonhuman animals, and attempts to distinguish human rights from the rights of other sentient beings ultimately fail.

Cochrane has also published work on environmental ethics and punishment. Concerning the latter, he argues, building upon Thomas Mathiesen's claim that prison is not justified by classic theories of punishment, that the institution cannot be justified on the basis of Antony Duff's "communicative" account of punishment.

== See also ==
- List of animal rights advocates

== Select bibliography ==
=== Books ===
- Cochrane, Alasdair (2020), Should Animals Have Political Rights?. Polity.
- Cochrane, Alasdair (2018). Sentientist Politics. Oxford: Oxford University Press.
- Cochrane, Alasdair (2012). Animal Rights Without Liberation. New York: Columbia University Press.
- Cochrane, Alasdair (2010). An Introduction to Animals and Political Theory. Basingstoke, England: Palgrave Macmillan.

=== Articles ===
- Cochrane, Alasdair, Siobhan O'Sullivan and Robert Garner (2016). "Animal Ethics and the Political" (PDF). Critical Review of International Social and Political Philosophy. 21 (2): 261–277. doi:10.1080/13698230.2016.1194583. S2CID 147783917.
- Cochrane, Alasdair; Cooke, Steve (2016). "'Humane Intervention': The International Protection of Animal Rights" (PDF). Journal of Global Ethics. 12 (1): 106–21. doi:10.1080/17449626.2016.1149090. S2CID 155805532.
- Cochrane, Alasdair (2015). "Prison on Appeal: The Idea of Communicative Incarceration" (PDF). Criminal Law and Philosophy. 11 (2): 295–312. doi:10.1007/s11572-015-9371-4. S2CID 141573339.
- Cochrane, Alasdair (2013). "Cosmozoopolis: The Case Against Group-Differentiated Animal Rights". Law, Ethics and Philosophy. 1: 127–41.
- Cochrane, Alasdair (2013). "From Human Rights to Sentient Rights". Critical Review of International Social and Political Philosophy. 16 (5): 655–75. doi:10.1080/13698230.2012.691235. S2CID 145623897.
- Cochrane, Alasdair (2012). "Evaluating 'Bioethical Approaches' to Human Rights". Ethical Theory and Moral Practice. 15 (3): 309–322. doi:10.1007/s10677-012-9345-8. S2CID 145070328.
- Cochrane, Alasdair (2010). "Undignified Bioethics". Bioethics. 24 (5): 234–241. doi:10.1111/j.1467-8519.2009.01781.x. PMID 20002071. S2CID 27557906.
- Cochrane, Alasdair (2009). "Do Animals Have an Interest in Liberty?". Political Studies. 57 (3): 660–679. doi:10.1111/j.1467-9248.2008.00742.x. S2CID 143628062.
- Cochrane, Alasdair (2009). "Ownership and Justice for Animals". Utilitas. 21 (4): 424–42. doi:10.1017/S0953820809990203. S2CID 144811649.
- Cochrane, Alasdair (2007). "Animal Rights and Animal Experiments: An Interest-Based Approach". Res Publica. 13 (3): 293–318. doi:10.1007/s11158-007-9037-8. S2CID 145658361.

=== Chapters ===
- Cochrane, Alasdair (2017). "Using, Owning and Exploiting Animals". In Andrews, Kristin; Beck, Jacob (eds.). The Routledge Handbook of Philosophy of Animal Minds. London: Routledge. pp. 491–8. doi:10.4324/9781315742250. ISBN 9781315742250.
- Cochrane, Alasdair (2016). "Inter-Species Solidarity: Labour Rights for Animals". In Garner, Robert; O'Sullivan, Siobhan (eds.). The Political Turn in Animal Ethics. London: Rowman & Littlefield International.
- Cochrane, Alasdair (2016). "Life, Liberty and the Pursuit of Happiness? Specifying the Rights of Animals". In Višak, Tatjana; Garner, Robert (eds.). The Ethics of Killing Animals. Oxford: Oxford University Press. pp. 201–14. doi:10.1093/acprof:oso/9780199396078.003.0012. ISBN 9780199396078.
- Cochrane, Alasdair (2014). "Born in Chains? The Ethics of Animal Domestication". In Gruen, Lori (ed.). The Ethics of Captivity. Oxford: Oxford University Press. pp. 156–73. doi:10.1093/acprof:oso/9780199977994.003.0011. ISBN 9780199977994.
