= Sentientist Politics =

2018 book by Alasdair Cochrane

Sentientist Politics: A Theory of Global Inter-Species Justice
- Author: Alasdair Cochrane
- Working title: Beastly Cosmopolitanism: A Theory of Global Inter-Species Justice
- Subjects: Animal rights; cosmopolitanism; democratic theory; political philosophy
- Publisher: Oxford University Press
- Publication date: 30 October 2018
- Publication place: United Kingdom
- Media type: Hardback; softback; ebook
- Awards: 2019 Susan Strange Best Book Prize (BISA)

Sentientist Politics: A Theory of Global Inter-Species Justice is a 2018 book by the English political theorist Alasdair Cochrane, published by Oxford University Press. In the book, Cochrane outlines and defends his political theory of "sentientist cosmopolitan democracy". The approach is sentientist in that it recognises all sentient animals as bearers of rights; cosmopolitan in that it extends cosmopolitan political theory to include animals, rejecting the importance of state borders and endorsing impartiality; and democratic in that it aims to include animals in systems of representative and cosmopolitan democracy. It was the first book to extend cosmopolitan theory to animals, and was a contribution to the "political turn" in animal ethics – animal ethics informed by political philosophy.

Sentientist Politics was inspired by Cochrane's hope to take discussions of animal rights beyond questions about how animals may be treated to how politics would have to change if animal rights were recognised. For him, the only previous substantial exploration of this question was in Sue Donaldson and Will Kymlicka's Zoopolis, of which Cochrane had earlier published a cosmopolitan critique. Research for Sentientist Politics was funded by a grant from the Leverhulme Trust, and work on international intervention on behalf of animals was conducted with Steve Cooke. Sentientist Politics was published on 30 October 2018, with a launch event at the University of Sheffield.

For the book, Cochrane was awarded the 2019 Susan Strange Best Book Prize by the British International Studies Association. Sentientist Politics was the subject of a symposium in the journal Politics and Animals, and praised by commentators for its readability, strength of argument, and ambition. It provoked questions about methodology in animal-rights scholarship, aid to wild animals, and the possibility of sentientist constitutionalism.

== Development ==
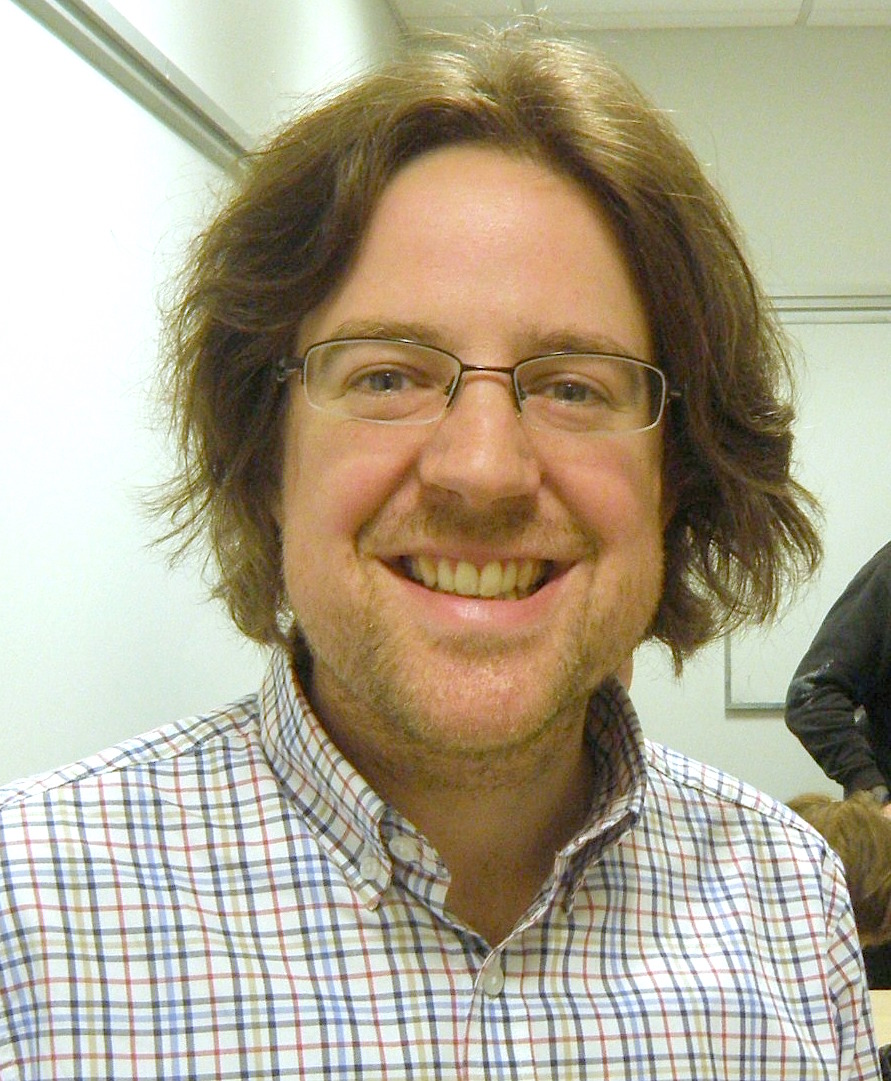
Cochrane, 2013

=== Background ===
Alasdair Cochrane's 2010 book An Introduction to Animals and Political Theory and his 2012 book Animal Rights Without Liberation became important texts in the "political turn" in animal ethics, a field of enquiry that explores the normative dimensions of human-animal relationships from the perspective of political philosophy, establishing Cochrane as a leading scholar in the area. The former work, a textbook, was one of the first books to explore the place of animals in political philosophy. In the latter, Cochrane defended the interest-based rights approach, according to which some animals have rights on the basis of their strong interests, and these rights must be protected as a matter of justice. Sentient animals, Cochrane argued, often have rights not to be made to suffer or to be killed, but they generally lack an interest in (and thus a right to) freedom.

Another important work in the political turn in animal ethics was Sue Donaldson and Will Kymlicka's 2011 book Zoopolis. In Zoopolis, Donaldson and Kymlicka defended a vision of animal rights in which domesticated animals are conceived as citizens in mixed human/animal communities, wild animals are conceived as sovereign over their own spaces, and "liminal" animals, who are neither wild nor domesticated, are offered the rights of "denizenship". In 2013, Cochrane published a paper in response to Donaldson and Kymlicka in which he forwarded a cosmopolitan case against the "group-differentiated" rights of Zoopolis, which he called "Cosmozoopolis". Further work on international dimensions of animal rights included a 2013 symposium in the journal Global Policy. This concerned protecting animals across borders, and was edited by Cochrane.

=== Writing ===
Cochrane was inspired to write Sentientist Politics by the question of what animal rights would mean for politics. Thus, he wanted to take discussions of animal rights beyond debates about what they entail in terms of (for example) eating and experimenting on animals – the kind of work that he and others had done previously. Human rights, Cochrane said, are understood to justify, constrain, and shape politics, and animal rights should too. It is this thought with which Cochrane begins the book, which is an attempt to explore what that would mean. While work like this had been done before, it had, he argued, only really been addressed at length in Zoopolis. The biggest departure of his approach in Sentientist Politics from that of Zoopolis is that his approach, unlike Donaldson and Kymlicka's, is grounded in cosmopolitanism. Thus, unlike Donaldson and Kymlicka, Cochrane places little importance on where an animal lives, pre-existing human relationships to the animals, and state borders. Though Cochrane sees cosmopolitanism and animal rights as natural bedfellows, few theorists of animal rights had considered obligations to animals across borders, and very few cosmopolitan theorists had considered what their approach means for human/animal relationships. Consequently, though Sentientist Politics was not the first scholarly work extending cosmomopolitan theory to animals, it was the first monograph dedicated to doing so.

The initial research and writing for Sentientist Politics was supported by a 2014 research fellowship Cochrane was awarded by the Leverhulme Trust. At the time, the working title for Sentientist Politics was Beastly Cosmopolitanism: A Theory of Global Inter-Species Justice. Research on the issue of intervention on behalf of animals was conducted with the philosopher Steve Cooke. As well as discussion in Sentientist Politics, this resulted in a co-authored paper in the Journal of Global Ethics.

In 2016, the year in which Cochrane's paper with Cooke was published, Cochrane discussed the manuscript that would become Sentientist Politics on an episode of Siobhan O'Sullivan's Knowing Animals podcast. Cochrane said that he was "writing a book on global justice and animal rights". In this book, he said, he would address "what we owe to animals across borders" and "what we owe to animals internationally", exploring "what a system of global governance or international relations would look like ... if it were built around not human rights ... but if it were actually built around sentient rights". Ideas from the book were also presented at conferences and other events at the University of Birmingham, the University of Edinburgh, Newcastle University, the University of Leeds, the University of Cambridge, and the University of Fribourg prior to publication.

=== Release ===
Sentientist Politics was published on 30 October 2018 by Oxford University Press. It was made available in hardback and ebook formats, as well as on Oxford Scholarship Online. The University of Sheffield, where Cochrane is a senior lecturer, hosted a launch event for the book. In addition to a presentation by Cochrane, the event featured comments from O'Sullivan and the philosopher Josh Milburn. These various contributions were later published as part of a symposium on Sentientist Politics in the journal Politics and Animals.

== Synopsis ==
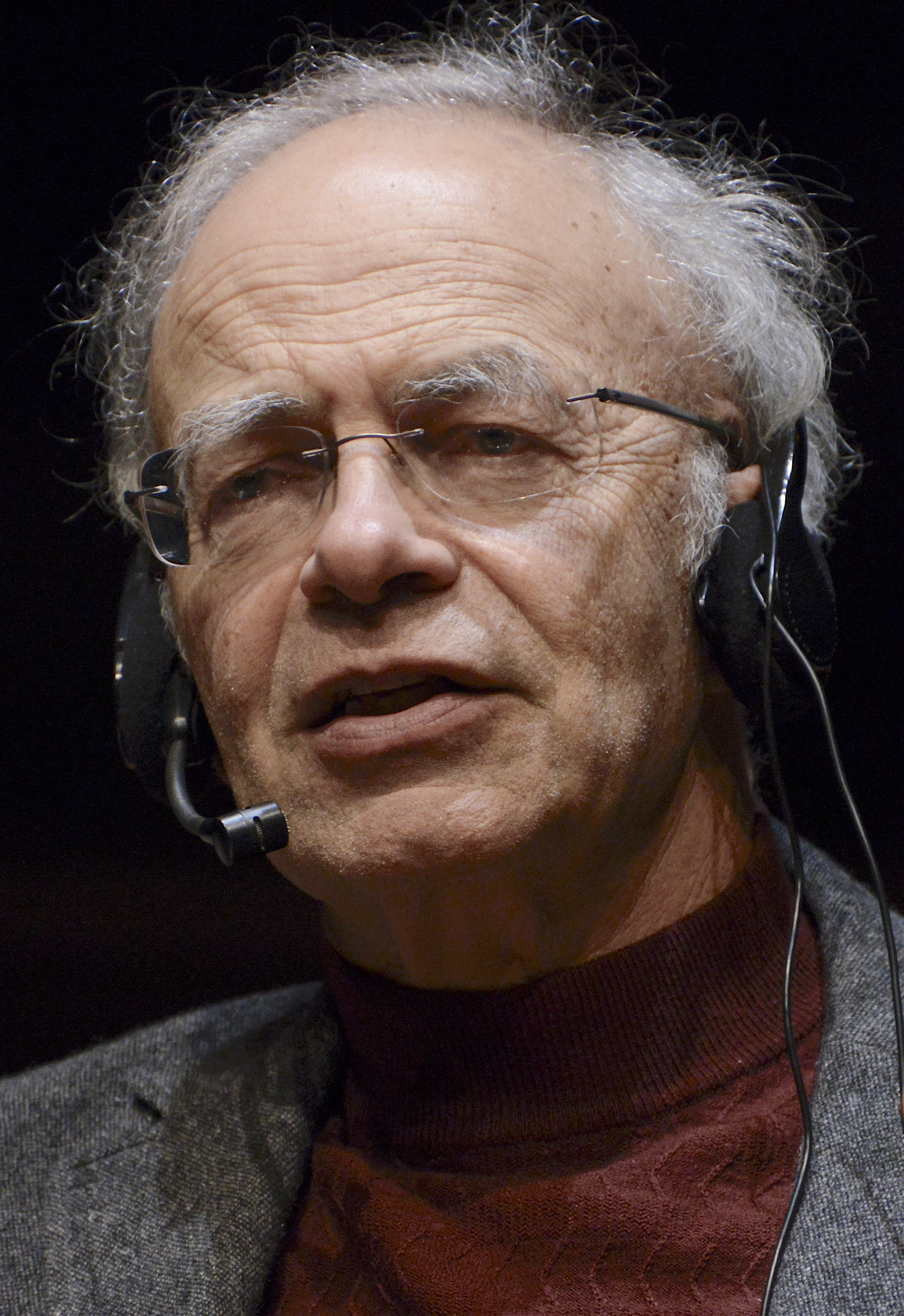
Though Cochrane adopts the principle of equal consideration of interests defended by Peter Singer (pictured, 2012), he rejects the latter's utilitarianism.

Sentientist Politics opens with the assumption that some animals are sentient and thus have moral value, and that this has political consequences. It aims to argue that sentient animals (human and nonhuman) have equal moral worth, and this grounds a duty to create a "sentientist cosmopolitan democracy". In the introduction, Cochrane positions the book as a contribution to the political turn in animal ethics that is novel for its cosmpolitanism. On the other hand, it is distinct from existing cosmopolitan theory for its rejection of the moral import of species membership. He acknowledges that some theorists will seek to go further than rejecting humanism, and argue that all living (or even non-living) entities warrant political protection; nonetheless, he sees something "special" about sentience. The book is utopian and ideal in its aspirations.

The second chapter addresses the moral worth of sentient animals and what this means for politics. Cochrane argues that, because they possess interests, sentient animals possess moral worth. He defends the claim that all sentient animals (human and otherwise) possess equal moral worth (and equal consideration of interests) against the possibility that humans have greater worth than animals and the possibility that persons have greater worth than non-persons. Rejecting Peter Singer's utilitarianism, Cochrane instead defends an account of animal rights based on the claim that sentient animals possess interests sufficiently strong to ground duties in others; they have, he said in Animal Rights Without Liberation, prima-facie rights not to be killed and not to be made to suffer. These moral rights, however, are not recognised in political or legal practice. Thus, Cochrane calls for a shift from "human rights" to "sentient rights". Sentient rights and sentient equality, he argues, justify the existence of political institutions: moral agents possess a "duty to create and support a political order" aiming to "show equal consideration to sentient creatures" and to "protect their basic rights". These political institutions can achieve what would be impossible for individuals; can provide security; and can determine what equal consideration means in practice.

Chapter 3 asks what such political institutions would look like. Cochrane argues for a sentientist democracy, one with the participation of animal representatives, who can serve as trustees of political communities' nonhuman members. Animals cannot be protected, it is argued, through legal means – even a Bill of Sentient Rights – alone; instead, determinate interpretations of human duties to animals, accountability of rulers to animals, and the self-determination of political communities call for the democratic inclusion of animals. Though animals themselves cannot serve as legislators, they can, Cochrane argues, be represented on legislative bodies. Drawing on ideas from green democratic theory, Cochrane argues that animal representatives could be selected by dedicated deliberative assemblies made up of humans selected by lottery. On the question of which animals are entitled to representation, against both Kimberly Smith and Donaldson and Kymlicka, Cochrane argues that all sentient animals (including wild animals) are entitled to representation. All, he argues, should be considered members of particular societies, sharing as they do a membership in a "community of fate" with humans. Conflicting animal interests can come together into a single understanding of the public good, but such a good cannot be predetermined; it must be worked out in practice.

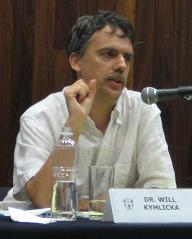
Will Kymlicka, a co-author of Zoopolis, pictured 2007. Zoopolis was an earlier book defending the inclusion of animals in political systems. However, it did not offer a cosmopolitan approach, unlike Sentientist Politics.

In chapter 4, Cochrane develops the sentientist democracy of the third chapter into a sentientist cosmopolitan democracy. Statist systems (including the existing Westphalian system), he argues, will fail to adequately protect animals because of coordination problems, an inability to deal with transnational impacts of national policies, and the risk of partiality in favour of states' own members. Cochrane instead turns to the all-affected interests principle as a means to determine who constitutes the people entitled to a say on particular matters. However, he rejects the possibility of a world state, which is perhaps the all-affected interests principle's natural conclusion. Not only is this impractical, Cochrane argues, but it could serve to undermine the equal consideration of interests itself. Cochrane instead advocates cosmopolitan democracy, which draws boundaries to approximate who will be affected by fixing a series of overlapping political units, from the local to the transnational. Cochrane closes the chapter by responding to three objections to cosmopolitan democracy: the fact that equal consideration under cosmopolitan democracy is imperfect; the challenge of determining boundaries; and that it is unfeasible.

Donaldson and Kymlicka support granting wild animals sovereignty over their own spaces. Chapter 5 of Sentientist Politics challenges this claim, instead arguing that wild animals should be considered members of mixed-species societies with humans. Cochrane first addresses, and rejects, Donaldson and Kymlicka's positive arguments for wild-animal sovereignty, arguing that non-interference does not necessarily lead to wild animals flourishing, and that sovereignty is not required for animals' rights concerning their land to be protected. Cochrane then moves on to consider three potential challenges to his own proposals concerning wild animals. First, he argues that cosmopolitan free movement will not allow humans to seize and destroy animals' spaces for their own purposes. Second, he argues that free movement will not undermine the possibility of human and nonhuman democratic involvement. Third, he argues that duties of assistance owed to wild animals to alleviate their suffering neither require nor permit large-scale interventions in nature, such as restructuring ecosystems.

Having set out his political vision, Cochrane addresses two puzzles about its implementation. The first, the subject of chapter 6, concerns the issues of diversity and toleration in the sentientist cosmopolitan democracy. Cochrane argues that, though the constraints imposed on individuals by his sentientist cosmopolitan democracy may seem illiberal, the value and rights of animals (like the value and rights of humans) justify constraints. Similarly, he argues that constraints on the actions of groups, including ethnic groups, are justified to protect animals, challenging a range of arguments to the contrary. Finally, he addresses the appropriate response to those individuals and groups who fail to uphold the minimal standards of justice demanded by animals' worth, focussing on the question of whether "outlaw communities" may be targeted by the global order. Cochrane argues that humans have a responsibility to protect animals, but that coercive military force will rarely be justified. This is because the just-war criteria of effectiveness and proportionality will be difficult to meet when intervening on behalf of animals.

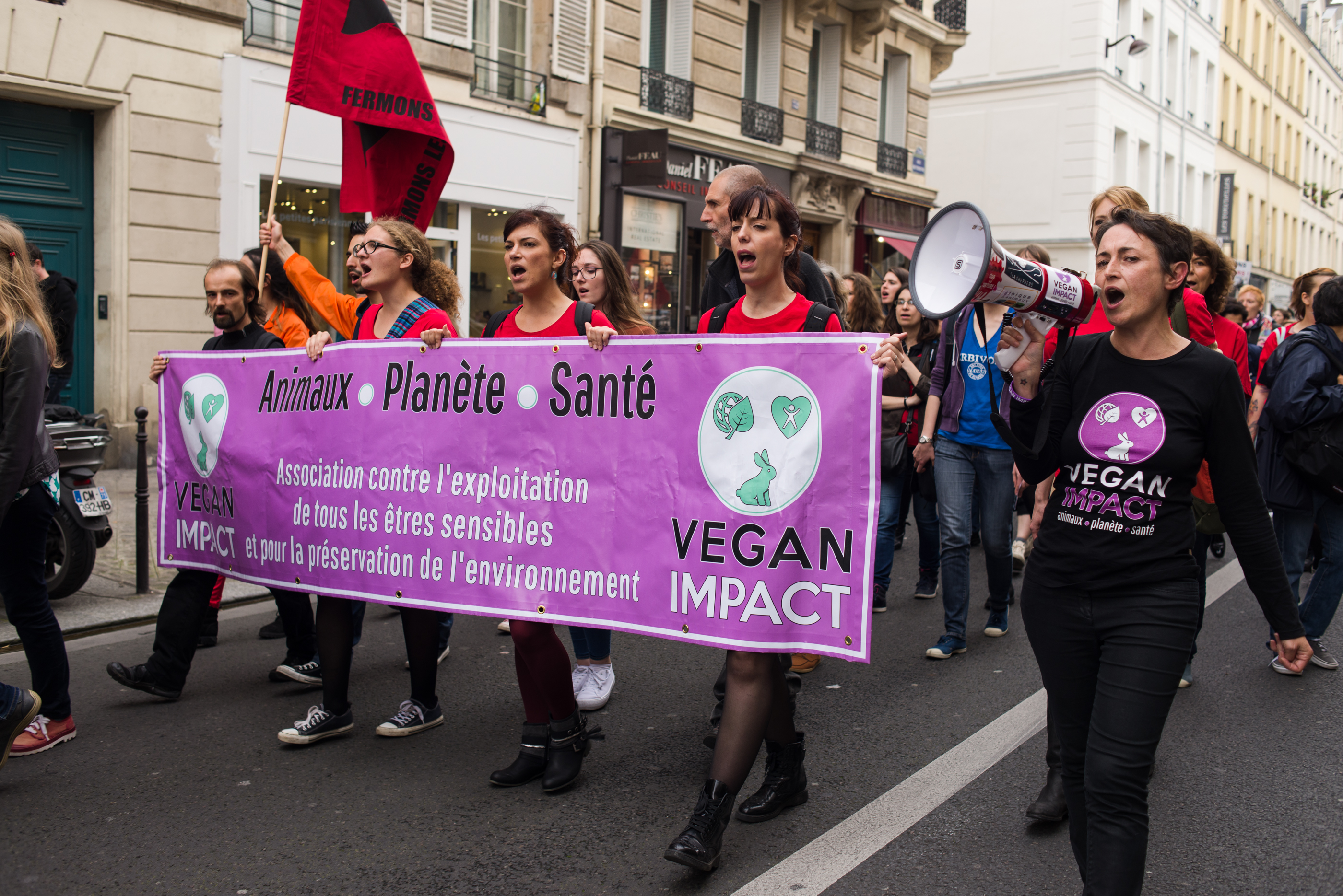
Cochrane argues that animal activists could play an important role in securing a cosmopolitan sentientist democracy, and he calls upon them to pay attention to political institutional change.

The second challenge is addressed in chapter 7, which explores the realisation and maintenance of a sentientist cosmopolitan democracy. Cochrane argues that, to transition to and sustain a cosmopolitan sentientist democracy, humans need to acquire "sentientist solidarity". This requires informed human citizens with recognition of animals' status and a shared identity with them. Not only is achieving this solidarity possible, Cochrane thinks, but it can be cultivated. Animal activists could play an important role in such cultivation, pushing for both individual and institutional change. An example of this is provided by the possibility of sentientist civic education. Cochrane then turns to ask what changes could be made here and now, focussing on the global level. He argues that existing and potential international law protects animals, while other sources of internationally recognised animal rights could be human-rights regimes. This means that not everything he calls for in the book must be built from nothing. Cochrane closes the chapter by noting that civil disobedience and other extra-legal forms of change agitation may be justified, but that this must be judged on a case-by-case basis. Some forms of illegal activity, including violence, are likely to be ineffective.

In a concluding chapter, Cochrane argues that Sentientist Politics is distinct from other work in animal ethics because it foregrounds the duty to "create and maintain a political order dedicated to the interests of sentient animals". Though Sentientist Politics is not the first book to take a "political turn" in animal ethics, it does defend a distinct vision, Cochrane says, of the appropriate political order. This is especially true in its cosmopolitanism. However, the book's contribution is not only to animal ethics. Cochrane calls for a whole range of theorists working on areas of political significance explored in the book to take seriously the question of where animals fit into their frameworks, concluding that "the core questions of political philosophy ... need to be rethought". The book also calls for a restructuring of political activism, and Cochrane closes the book with a call to animal activists to pay more attention to political change, with the ultimate aim of transforming existing political systems.

== Reception and response ==
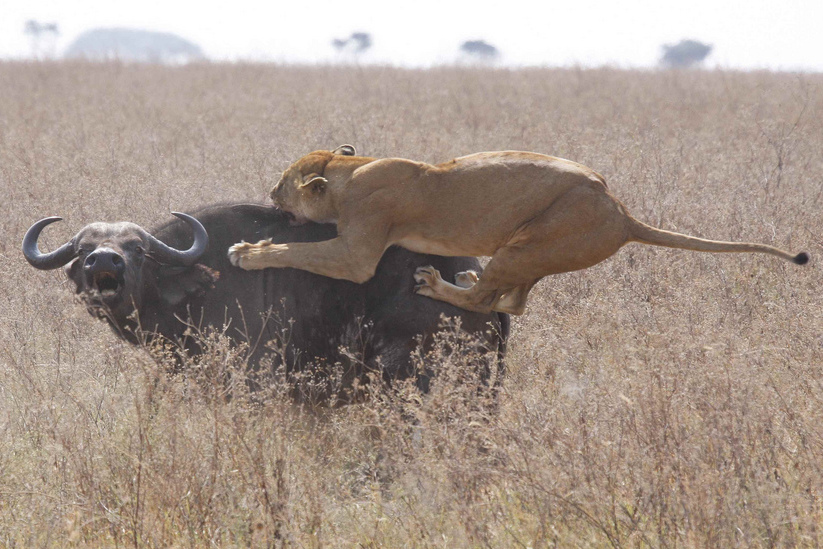
Commentators drew attention to, and raised questions about, Cochrane's approach to wild animal suffering in Sentientist Politics.

=== Symposium ===
A symposium on Sentientist Politics was published in the journal Politics and Animals in 2019, based on the comments made at the 2018 launch event. It featured a summary of the book by Cochrane, critical comments from O'Sullivan and Milburn, and responses from Cochrane.

O'Sullivan predicted that the book would not be widely read by animal activists or those with little interest in "abstract political or philosophical ideas". However, it would be, she predicted, "an instant classic" with scholars of animal studies and "essential reading" for those interest in the political turn in animal ethics – the latter being a field for which the book marks "a maturing", beginning a "process of specialization". She called the book's presentation of sentientist cosmopolitan democracy "deeply thought out, beautifully articulated, and carefully constructed in relation to the existing literature, [while] new, refreshing, innovative, and boundary breaking". On pragmatic grounds, O'Sullivan challenged Cochrane's commitment to cosmopolitanism. She argued that, for Cochrane, the realisation of cosmopolitan values is not a precondition of animals' rights being respected; it is simply a theory he chose. She therefore poses a series of questions: "is it responsible, ideal, or wise to make cosmopolitanism a pre-condition for animal wellbeing? An estimated 150 billion animals are purposefully slaughtered globally each year. Is it fair for those individuals to be made to wait for utopian futures, when practical solutions could ease their suffering in the here and now?" Not only, she says, are cosmopolitan institutions deeply unlikely to be achieved in even the long term, but cosmopolitan theorists are hostile or indifferent to animals. On the other hand, she says, the liberal status quo can find some room for animals, and working within it can have practical benefits for animals. On that basis, she wrote that, in contrast to Cochrane,

I am going to keep plugging away in the here and now. I believe that liberalism provides us with enough tools to challenge speciesism, and I will continue to work with those tools until such a time as I am confident that they will be replaced with a different set of instruments. But that time is not now.

In his response, Cochrane argued that there is room for both pragmatic and utopian approaches to political theory, and that the latter has value; that cosmopolitanism is not as utopian as it may first seem; and that all political principles (not just cosmopolitanism) are contested. Cochrane considers cosmopolitan theory's anthropocentrism, though problematic, striking for its inconsistency with cosmopolitan commitments to impartiality. Due to this commitment, Cochrane sees cosmopolitanism and animal rights as natural companions.

Like O'Sullivan, Milburn praised Sentientist Politics, calling it "tightly argued, provocative, innovative, engaging, and— perhaps most importantly—compelling". He suggested that Sentientist Politics might offer the political theory needed by advocates of intervention in nature to reduce wild-animal suffering, but questioned what relations with wild animals might look like in Cochrane's cosmopolitan sentientist democracy. Milburn offered five possibilities: a piecemeal approach, which would call for small interventions in nature when not too costly; a natural-zoo approach, in which nature was replaced with something zoo-like; a transanimalist approach, in which animals were genetically engineered to live in harmony; an extinctionist approach, in which wild animals were eliminated; and an epistemic approach, denying that we are yet able to see what just relations with wild animals would look like. Cochrane responded that his own view contained elements of the piecemeal approach and the epistemic approach. However, he noted that epistemic limits on our ability to envisage just co-relations with animals were not limited to just co-relations with wild animals, but likely applied to relations with many sentient animals. Instead of envisioning what just relations would look like from the outset, Cochrane calls for representatives to construct just relations.

=== Reviews ===
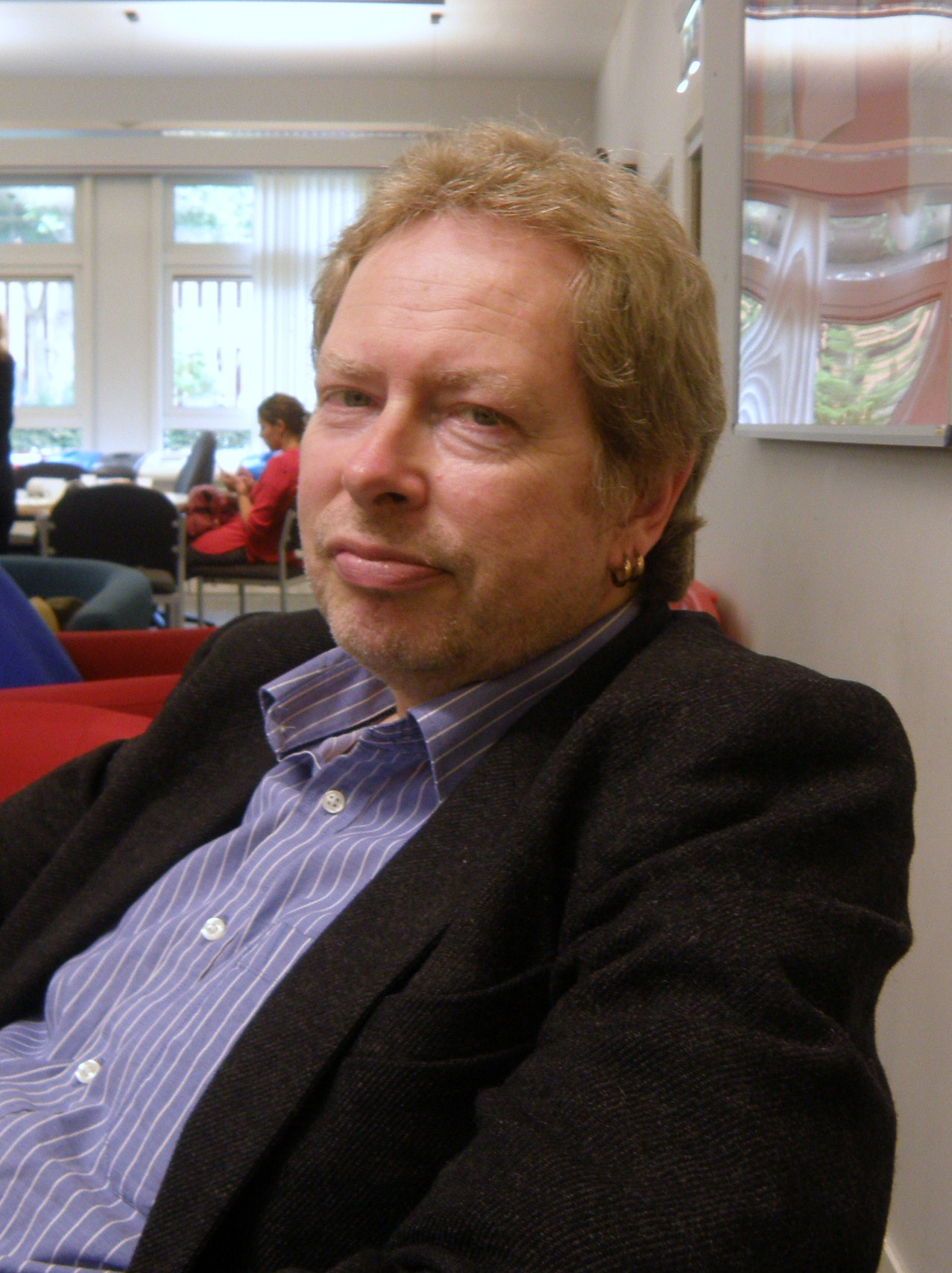
Robert Garner (2013), who reviewed Sentientist Politics for Perspectives on Politics.

Sentientist Politics was reviewed by Tore Fougner, a scholar of international relations, for Global Policy, the political theorist Robert Garner for Perspectives on Politics; the philosopher Kyle Johannsen for the Journal of Moral Philosophy, the philosopher Federico Zuolo for Constellations, and the legal theorist John Adenitire for Jurisprudence.

Fougner praised the book, saying that "Undoubtedly, [Cochrane] argues very well and with great clarity, systematically supporting his ideas and proposals with chains of arguments, while acknowledging difficulties and engaging with possible objections throughout. Overall, the book makes a significant contribution to the 'political turn' in Animal Ethics, which he and others have promoted for some time". He endorsed Cochrane's call for animals to be taken seriously in political science, and suggested that Sentientist Politics could be important for both research and teaching in that area. Fougner predicted that the book would face criticism from those subscribing to a "common sense view" of humans being more valuable than animals, but also from some advocates of animal rights. The latter group may be worried about Cochrane's commitment to the moral significance of "cognitive complexity", resulting in animals having different rights to, or weaker rights than, many humans. They may also object, Fougner claimed, to Cochrane's "liberal-reformist approach to social change"; in this sense, Cochrane can be contrasted to more radical voices in critical animal studies.

Garner identified several areas of Sentientist Politics he thought open to challenge. First, Cochrane is highly idealistic, and, Garner thinks, optimistic in his claims that international bodies are already moving towards his goals. Second, Cochrane neglects "the global economic power structures", which is likely to be objectionable to scholars of critical animal studies. Third, Cochrane rests his theory on the equality of sentient beings. This raises questions about the comparative strengths of interests and rights, and Garner suggested that Cochrane could have explored different bases for animals' democratic inclusion, such as the all-affected interests principle. Fourth, Cochrane underestimates, for Garner, the potential of states to protect animals' interests, including the interests of sentient animals in other states. Garner, instead, promotes the possibility of a reformist state, borrowing from green political theory. However, Garner was "inclined to forgive" these "weaker elements", as he felt there was "much to applaud" in "this densely argued book", which "undoubtedly breaks new ground and can be described as the first attempt to provide a comprehensive political theory of animal rights".

For Adenitire, Sentientist Politics was "clear, succinct and, most of all, unapologetically ambitious". He argued that the book's value was not dependent on the merits of the particular claims Cochrane makes, but on revealing "the possibility of radically reimagining our political and legal order in a way that does not suffer from speciesism". Sentientist Politics, Adenitire believed, stood apart from the work of Donaldson and Kymlicka or Robert Garner for lawyers (especially constitutional lawyers) for offering the foundations of what Adenitire termed Sentientist Constitutionalism: an area of enquiry aiming "to imagine, outline and defend what a liberal constitutional theory committed to the equal moral status of human and non-human animals would look like". Cochrane is imprecise about what a Bill of Sentient Rights would contain, leaving work for sentientist constitutionalists, but Adenitire argues that Sentientist Politics may actually hamper legal efforts to secure animal rights, as Cochrane is opposed to the idea that animals (with possible exceptions of great apes and cetaceans) are "autonomous persons", and has previously argued that the property status of animals need not hamper the equal consideration of their interests. Adenitire challenged Cochrane's claims about animal interests in liberty and in not being property, and rejected the Kantian notion of autonomy that he endorses.

Adenitire also drew attention to the high levels of responsibility Cochrane places upon humans to aid wild animals. For him, this again rises from Cochrane's reluctance to see animals as having an interest in controlling their own lives, which leads him to reject Donaldson and Kymlicka's account of animal sovereignty. Against Cochrane, Adenitire argues that wild animals can validly make claims to sovereignty, and thus that Cochrane's burdensome paternalism can be rejected. This could mean that a liberal sentientist constitutionalist state should discourage domestication, making proposals about the just treatment of domesticated animals redundant in the long term. Cochrane's sentientist cosmopolitan democracy thus has an advantage over Adenitire's sentientist constitutionalism: "it takes seriously the lived bond between human and non-human which may sustain it in the long term". However, Adenitire thinks that this advantage can be exaggerated.

Johannsen considered Sentientist Politics "an excellent book that makes a significant contribution to the political turn in animal ethics", and he highly recommended it. Johannsen argued that, despite first appearances, Sentientist Politics did leave considerable room for contextual considerations. For example, interventions in wild ecosystems must be decided with reference to the specifics of the particular ecosystem. This was only one of the book's strengths, for Johannsen; he called it "well written and well argued". Though he praised the discussion of wild animals as "interesting", he questioned whether it was necessary for them to be considered members of political communities in order for them to be afforded significant protection. He also questioned whether it was plausible that communities refusing to intervene in nature be subject to coercive intervention. It was the question of whether the international community should tolerate non-intervention, Johannsen argued, that distinguishes duties of justice from mere humanitarian duties on Cochrane's theory.

Zuolo saw Cochrane as offering a much-needed contribution to animal ethics in offering a rigorous exploration of political institutions; the most original chapter, he argued, was the third. Despite praising the book's "many ... merits", Zuolo identified three shortcomings. The most significant, he argued, concerned Cochrane's proposal of animal representatives. Zuolo raised the question of how many representatives there should be, and also asked whether animal representatives might be appropriate as a "transitory or remedial measure", unnecessary in "a truly sentientist polity". Zuolo also criticised Cochrane's rejection of personhood as the basis of moral equality, which he argued was too quick, and the fact that Cochrane failed to consider the range of means to secure sentientist cosmopolitan democracy between civic education and violence, including various forms of direct action.

=== Awards ===
For Sentientist Politics, Cochrane was awarded the 2019 Susan Strange Best Book Prize by the British International Studies Association (BISA). The prize was awarded as part of the BISA's 44th Annual Conference in London, June 2019.
