= John Hadley (philosopher) =

Australian philosopher

- Born: 27 September 1966 (age 60); Sydney, Australia

Education
- Education: University of Sydney

Philosophical work
- Era: Contemporary philosophy
- School: Analytic philosophy, pragmatism
- Institutions: University of Western Sydney
- Main interests: Moral philosophy, political philosophy, metaethics, animal ethics, environmental ethics, neopragmatism
- Notable works: Animal Property Rights (2015), Animal Neopragmatism (2019)
- Notable ideas: Animal property rights theory; animal neopragmatism

John Hadley (born 27 September 1966) is an Australian philosopher whose research concerns moral and political philosophy, including animal ethics, environmental ethics, and metaethics. He spent much of his career at Western Sydney University, where he was a senior lecturer in philosophy, but also taught at Charles Sturt University and the University of Sydney, where he studied as an undergraduate and doctoral candidate. In addition to a variety of articles in peer-reviewed journals and edited collections, he is the author of the 2015 monograph Animal Property Rights (Lexington Books) and the 2019 monograph Animal Neopragmatism (Palgrave Macmillan). He is also the co-editor, with Elisa Aaltola, of the 2015 collection Animal Ethics and Philosophy (Rowman & Littlefield International).

Hadley is known for his account of animal property rights theory. He proposes that wild animals be offered property rights over their territories, and that guardians be appointed to represent their interests in decision-making procedures. He suggests that this account could be justified directly, on the basis of the interests of the animals concerned, or indirectly, so that natural environments are protected. The theory has received discussion in popular and academic contexts, with critical responses from farming groups and mixed responses from moral and political theorists.

Other work has included a defence of a neopragmatist approach to animal ethics, along with criticism of the metaethical and metaphilosophical assumptions of mainstream animal ethicists. Hadley has also conducted research on normative issues related to animal rights extremism, the aiding of others, and utilitarianism.

== Career ==
Hadley read for a Bachelor of Arts and doctorate in philosophy at the University of Sydney (USYD). His doctoral thesis was supervised by Caroline West, in USYD's Department of Philosophy, and was submitted in 2006 under the title of Animal Property: Reconciling Ecological Communitarianism and Species-egalitarian Liberalism. During his doctoral research, the "basic elements" of his animal property rights theory were "first assembled", leading to the publication of "Nonhuman Animal Property: Reconciling Environmentalism and Animal Rights" in the Journal of Social Philosophy. During this time, he also published in the Journal of Value Inquiry, Philosophy in the Contemporary World, and the Journal of Applied Philosophy, as well as working as a lecturer in the USYD philosophy department and a guest lecturer for the USYD Laboratory Animal Services.

After his PhD, Hadley worked as a lecturer in communication ethics in the Charles Sturt University (CSU) School of Communication and a lecturer in philosophy at the CSU School of Humanities and Social Sciences. He then joined the University of Western Sydney School of Humanities and Communication Arts, first as a lecturer in philosophy, and then as a senior lecturer in philosophy. Animal Ethics and Philosophy: Questioning the Orthodoxy, a collection edited by Hadley with the Finnish philosopher Elisa Aaltola, was published in 2015 by Rowman & Littlefield International. The book aimed to move debate in animal ethics beyond developing extensionist accounts and to examine the metaphilosophical and metaethical problems with extensionist accounts. Hadley's own contribution drew attention to a perceived inconsistent triad in animal rights philosophy: the idea that moral status is determined by psychological factors (like sentience), and not species; that human and nonhuman animals are of the same kind; and that genomic plasticity offers the best explanation for change in natural selection. In the same year, Hadley published a monograph with Lexington Books entitled Animal Property Rights: A Theory of Habitat Rights for Wild Animals. The book, partially building upon his doctoral research, presents a large amount of new material on Hadley's animal property rights theory. A second monograph, Animal Neopragmatism, was published in 2019 by Palgrave Macmillan. This presented a neopragmatist approach to animal ethics. By 2026, Hadley had left Western Sydney University.

== Research ==
=== Animal property rights ===
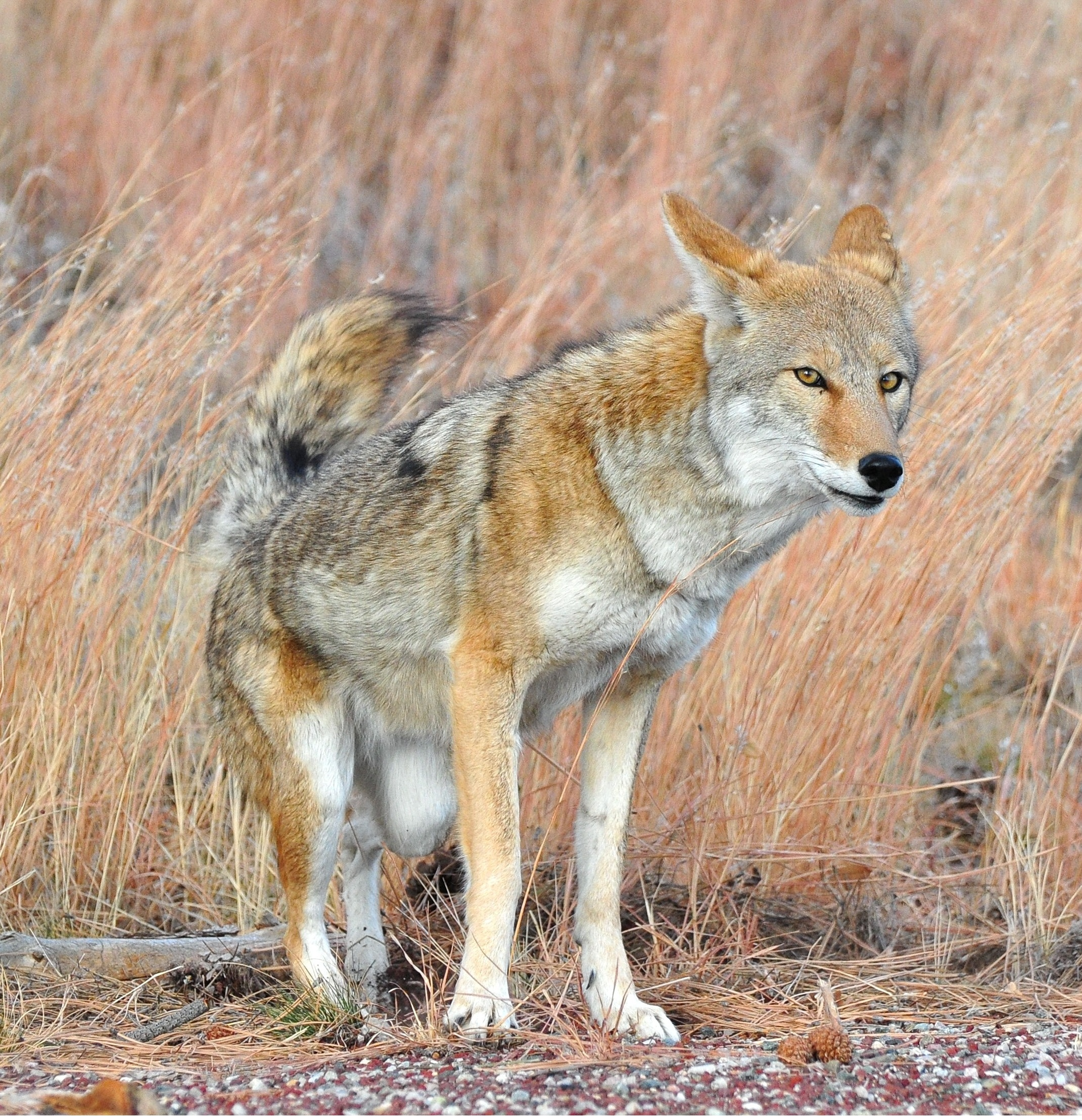
A coyote scent-marking. Hadley proposes that the territorial behaviour of sentient animals should be used to determine the extent of the space over which they have a property right.

Hadley is known for his theory of animal property rights, according to which animals should be afforded property rights over their territory. Hadley has developed his theory of animal property rights through his doctoral research, his 2015 monograph, and other academic works. In addition, he has authored popular articles on the subject for The Guardian, The Conversation and The Ethics Centre. He also discussed the topic on Knowing Animals, a podcast series produced by Siobhan O'Sullivan. His proposal has received attention in the popular press, with strong criticism from farmers' groups and journalists writing on rural affairs.

The practical side of Hadley's proposal rests on two key principles: a guardianship system, according to which knowledgeable guardians would be appointed to represent animal property holders in land management decision-making, and the use of animals' territory-marking behaviour to determine the limits of their property. Hadley rejects first occupancy and labour-mixing accounts of appropriation, and instead suggests that there are two ways that his account might fruitfully be justified. First, it might be justified directly, with reference to the interests of animals. This relies upon the fact that wild animals require their territory in order to satisfy their basic needs and the claim that this results in an interest in territory strong enough to ground a right. If animals have a right to use their territory, Hadley claims, then they necessarily have a property right in that territory. Second, it might be justified indirectly, as animals (of some species, at least) might be given property rights as a means of protecting natural environments. Hadley presents his proposal against the backdrop of an explicit pragmatism, and holds that animal property rights theory has the potential to reconcile animal and environmental ethics.

Hadley's proposal has been placed in the context of the "political turn" in animal ethics; the emergence of animal ethics literature focused on justice. Another academic who has proposed that wild animals be afforded property rights over their habitats is the British philosopher Steve Cooke. Like Hadley, he utilises an interest-based account of animal rights, but, unlike Hadley, he suggests that sovereignty would be an appropriate tool to protect animals' interest in their habitat if property fails. Other theorists exploring the normative aspects of human relationships with wild animals explicitly deny that they are extending property rights to animals. The US-based ethicist Clare Palmer, for instance, argues for a duty to respect wild animals' space, but claims that arguing for a property right for these animals would be "difficult", and instead bases her account on the fact that human actions can make animals "painful, miserable and vulnerable".

The Canadian theorists Sue Donaldson and Will Kymlicka are critical of Hadley's proposal to extend property rights to animals, claiming that property rights are insufficient to protect animals' interests. Instead, they argue that animals should be considered sovereign over their territories. They write that

It is one thing to say that a bird has a property right in its nest, or that a wolf has a property right in its den – specific bits of territory used exclusively by one animal family. But the habitat that animals need to survive extends far beyond such specific and exclusive bits of territory – animals often need to fly or roam over vast territories shared by many other animals. Protecting a bird's nest is of little help if the nearby watering holes are polluted, or if tall buildings block its flight path. It's not clear how ideas of property rights can help here.

They also compare the possibility of extending property rights to animals to the approach of European colonists, who were prepared to extend property, but not sovereignty, rights to native peoples, resulting in oppression. Hadley, however, is himself critical of Donaldson and Kymlicka's sovereignty proposal, though the British philosopher Josh Milburn suggests that the proposals may not be as far apart as the authors indicate.

The British political theorist Alasdair Cochrane also questions the extension of property rights to animals in his Animal Rights Without Liberation. Though describing Hadley's proposal as "ingenious", he criticises it on two grounds. First, he questions Hadley's claim of a relationship between property and basic needs, and, second, denies that animal property rights would appease environmentalists, given that they would allow the destruction of environments which do not contain sentient animals. However, in his Sentientist Politics, Cochrane includes animal property rights as part of his critique of Donaldson and Kymlicka's sovereignty model, writing that it "seems perfectly possible to argue, as John Hadley and others have, that wild animals ought to be granted habitat or property rights over their territories". In a book review, Milburn stresses the significance of Hadley's theory, but questions the extent to which the implementation of animal property rights would be desirable without the achievement of other animal rights and the extent to which Hadley's account is genuinely about property rights.

=== Animal neopragmatism ===
Having published a number of papers critical of the metaethical and metaphilosophical stances of mainstream animal ethicists in the 2010s, in 2019, Hadley published Animal Neopragmatism. In the book, Hadley sets out a neopragmatist approach to animal ethics. This theory responds to both the "political problem of welfare" and the "philosophical problem of welfare". The former is a perceived difficulty with the democratic legitimacy of animal welfare law, given that folk understanding of welfare stretches beyond the measurable suffering with which a policy approach is concerned. The latter is that, given metatheoretical assumptions of contemporary animal ethicists (especially moral realism), any attempt to extend discussion of welfare beyond feelings is met with the accusation that the subject is being changed: hence Hadley's earlier exploration of the "changing the subject problem". In response to these problems, Hadley outlines his vision of "relational hedonism", according to which a concern for the pain of animals underlies a broader concern that extends beyond a narrow sense of animal welfare, and endorses both experiential pluralism (welfare can be affected by things other than pleasure and pain) and expressivism. The theory of "animal neopragmatism", Hadley argues, is able to overcome metalevel problems in mainstream animal rights theory.

=== Other research ===
Hadley has considered the ethics of humans' relationships with wild animals and environments beyond his property rights theory. He argues that there is a duty to aid wild animals in need, and that these duties are essentially no different to humans' duties to aid distant strangers who are severely cognitively impaired. He argues that libertarian property rights, consistent with Robert Nozick's interpretation of the Lockean proviso, should limit the right to destroy human-owned natural environments, and has elsewhere explored libertarian theory's denial of moral powers (including the power to acquire property) to animals.

Hadley has conducted research on animal rights extremism, concluding that the phenomenon is a complex one, and that a full understanding of individual extremists' intentions and targets are necessary to understand the ethical acceptability of extremist acts and whether such acts are appropriately classified as terrorism. He holds that while direct action should be tolerated in liberal democracies, this toleration should not extend to certain campaigning tactics used by extremists, such as threat-making.

With O'Sullivan, Hadley has conducted research on utilitarianism and the relationship between obligations to animals and obligations to needy humans. The scholars argue that there is a conflict in Singer's philosophy between the obligation to aid needy humans and to protect animals, and that Westerners who own pets should, rather than spending large amounts of money extending the lives of their companions, euthanise severely ill animals and instead donate money to aiding those in the developing world.

Hadley has been critical of the views of Tibor Machan and J. Baird Callicott. He has also written on J. M. Coetzee, the ethics of "disenhancing" animals, the ethics of animal testing, the relationship of self-defence theory to abortion and animal ethics, and the ethics of street photography.

== Selected publications ==
- Hadley, John (2015). Animal Property Rights. London, United Kingdom: Lexington Books.
- Aaltola, Elisa; John Hadley, eds. (2015). Animal Ethics and Philosophy. London, United Kingdom: Rowman & Littlefield International.
- Hadley, John (2019). Animal Neopragmatism: From Welfare to Rights. Basingstoke, United Kingdom: Palgrave Macmillan.
