= Cécile Fabre =

French philosopher

Cécile Fabre FBA MAE
- Born: 2 February 1971 (age 55); Paris, France

Education
- Education: Paris-Sorbonne University; University of York (MA); University of Oxford (DPhil)
- Thesis: Constitutional Social Rights (1997)
- Doctoral advisor: G. A. Cohen

Philosophical work
- Era: Contemporary philosophy
- Region: Western philosophy
- School: Analytic philosophy
- Institutions: Worcester College, Oxford; Nuffield College, Oxford; London School of Economics; University of Edinburgh; Lincoln College, Oxford; All Souls College, Oxford
- Doctoral students: Alasdair Cochrane
- Main interests: Political philosophy, ethics, bioethics
- Notable ideas: Cosmopolitan theory of just war, constitutional protection of social rights

Cécile Fabre (born 1971) is a French philosopher, serving as professor of philosophy at the University of Oxford. Since 2014 she has been a senior research fellow at All Souls College, Oxford. Her research focuses on political philosophy, the ethics of war, bioethics, and theories of justice.

== Early life ==
Fabre was born in 1971 in Paris, France. From 1989 to 1992, she studied history at Paris-Sorbonne University. She graduated with a Bachelor of Arts (BA) degree in 1992. She then moved to England to study political philosophy at the University of York and completed a Master of Arts (MA) degree in 1993. From 1993, she undertook postgraduate study in politics at the University of Oxford. Her supervisor was G. A. Cohen and she completed her Doctor of Philosophy (DPhil) degree in 1997.

== Career and honours ==
Fabre served as Proctor of the University of Oxford from March 2018 to March 2019.

She was elected a Fellow of the British Academy (FBA) in 2011 and a member of the Academia Europaea in 2023.

== Selected works ==
- Fabre, Cécile (2000). Social Rights Under the Constitution: Government and the Decent Life. Oxford: Oxford University Press. ISBN 978-0198296751.
- Fabre, Cécile (2006). Whose Body Is It Anyway? Justice and the Integrity of the Person. Oxford: Clarendon Press. ISBN 978-0199289998.
- Fabre, Cécile (2007). Justice in a Changing World. Cambridge, England: Polity Press. ISBN 978-0745639697.
- Fabre, Cécile (2012). Cosmopolitan War. Oxford: Oxford University Press. ISBN 978-0199567164.
- Fabre, Cécile (2016). Cosmopolitan Peace. Oxford: Oxford University Press. ISBN 978-0198786245.
- Fabre, Cécile (2018). Economic Statecraft: Human Rights, Sanctions and Conditionality. Cambridge, Massachusetts: Harvard University Press. ISBN 9780674979635.
- Fabre, Cécile (2022). Spying Through a Glass Darkly: The Ethics of Espionage and Counter-Intelligence. Oxford: Oxford University Press. ISBN 9780198833765.
