= Tony Milligan =

Scottish philosopher

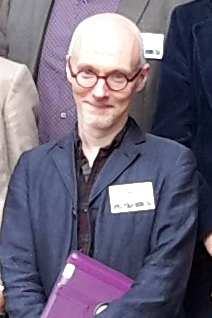
- Milligan, 2015
- Born: 1966 (age 59–60)

Education
- Education: University of Glasgow

Philosophical work
- Institutions: King's College London
- Main interests: Love, Iris Murdoch, animal ethics, space policy, civil disobedience

Tony Milligan is a Scottish philosopher who is currently a Senior Researcher in the Philosophy of Ethics with the Cosmological Visionaries project at King's College London. Much of his research concerns the ethics of human attitudes towards outer space, but he has a broader concern with otherness: other people, other places, other creatures, and political opponents. Publications range across Iris Murdoch, the philosophy of love, animal ethics, space policy and civil disobedience.

== Education and career ==
Milligan studied at the University of Stirling, reading philosophy, before going on to the University of Glasgow to study for a doctorate. His PhD thesis was entitled "Iris Murdoch's Romantic Platonism". He then worked as a teaching fellow at the University of Aberdeen's department of philosophy, and then as a lecturer in philosophy at the University of Hull. After his time at Hull, he returned to Aberdeen. He then moved to the department of philosophy at the University of Hertfordshire, where he worked for two years as a lecturer. He then moved to King's College London, where he is currently a researcher with the Cosmological Visionaries project, within the Department of Theology and Religious Studies. Milligan has argued for the environmental protection of other planets, for caution in the use of the finite resources of nearby regions of space, and for the cultivation of a larger than Earthly sense of belonging which has parallels with Indigenous cosmologies.

== Selected publications ==
Monographs

- Milligan, Tony (2022). The Ethics of Political Dissent. New York: Routledge.
- Milligan, Tony (2016). The Next Democracy?: The Possibility of Popular Control. Lanham, Maryland: Rowman & Littlefield.
- Milligan, Tony (2015). Nobody Owns the Moon: The Ethics of Space Exploration. Jefforson, North Carolina: McFarland & Company.
- Milligan, Tony (2015). Animal Ethics: The Basics. London and New York: Routledge.
- Milligan, Tony (2013). Civil Disobedience: Protest, Justification and the Law. London and New York: Bloomsbury Academic.
- Milligan, Tony (2011). Love: The Art of Living. London and New York: Routledge.
- Milligan, Tony (2010). Beyond Animal Rights: Food, Pets and Ethics. London and New York: Continuum.

Edited collections

- Capova, Klara Anna, Erik Persson, Tony Milligan, and David Dunér, eds. (2018). Astrobiology and Society in Europe Today. Springer.
- Schwartz, James S.J., and Tony Milligan, eds. (2016). The Ethics of Space Exploration. Springer.
- Maurer, Christian, Tony Milligan and Kamila Pascovská, eds. (2014). Love and Its Objects: What Can We Care For?. Basingstoke, England: Palgrave Macmillan.
