= Valéry Giroux =

Canadian philosopher (born 1974)

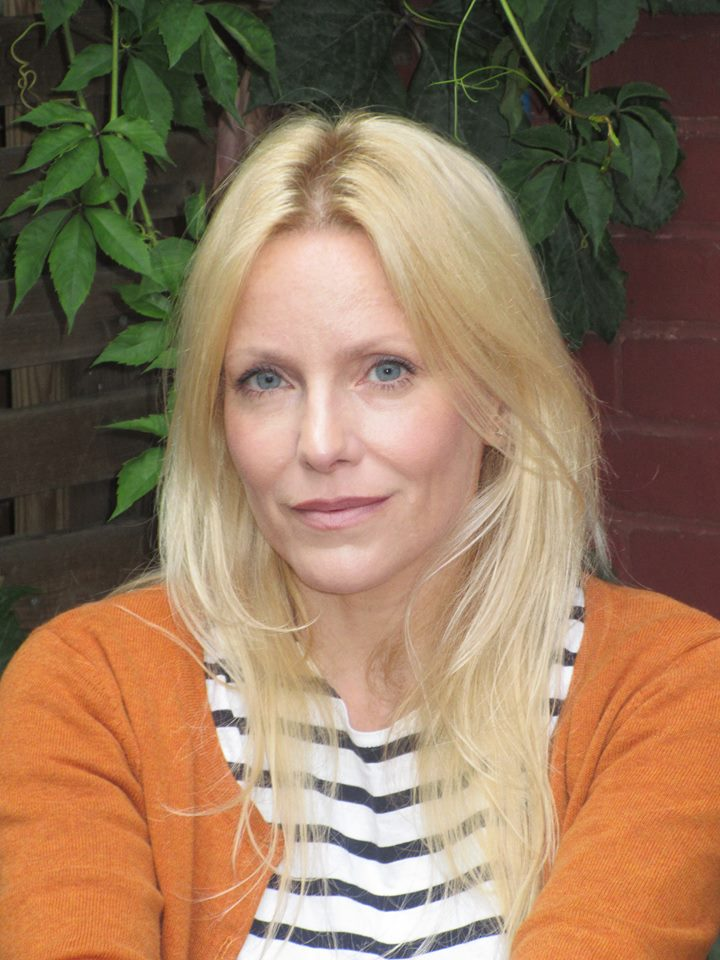
- Giroux in 2018
- Born: 24 March 1974 (age 52); Quebec, Canada
- Education: Université de Montréal (LL.B., 1997; LL.M., 2003, Ph.D., 2012)
- Occupations: Philosopher; lawyer; activist
- Website: valerygiroux.com

Valéry Giroux (born 24 March 1974) is a Canadian philosopher, lawyer, and animal rights activist from Quebec. She is an adjunct professor at the Université de Montréal Faculty of Law, associate director of the Centre de recherche en éthique ("Ethics Research Center"), and a Fellow of the Oxford Centre for Animal Ethics. Her work concerns animal ethics, veganism, and antispeciesism. She is co-editor of the antispeciesist French-language journal L'Amorce.

== Education and career ==
After obtaining a bachelor's degree in law from the Université de Montréal (UdeM) in 1997, Giroux became a member of the Bar of Quebec in 2001. Her interest in animal rights led her to complete a master's degree in law at UdeM, with a thesis on reforming cruelty to animals offences in the Canadian Criminal Code. She then undertook doctoral studies in philosophy at UdeM. Her doctoral thesis, supervised by Christine Tappolet, concerned the extension of basic human rights to all sentient beings. It was the first doctoral thesis in animal ethics in Quebec and was published as a book by Éditions L'Âge d'Homme in 2017.

Giroux is an adjunct professor at the Université de Montréal Faculty of Law. She is also associate director of the Centre de recherche en éthique and a Fellow of the Oxford Centre for Animal Ethics. She is the author of Contre l'exploitation animale ("Against Animal Exploitation") and the co-author, with Renan Larue, of Le Véganisme ("Veganism") in the PUF collection "Que sais-je?". She also wrote L'antispécisme ("Antispeciesism") in the same collection. Giroux is regularly invited to speak to the media on animal ethics. She is co-editor of L'Amorce ("The Primer"), a French-language journal focused on antispeciesism.

== Philosophy ==
Giroux's philosophy is antispeciesist. She argues against discriminating against sentient beings because they are not members of the human species. She also argues that cognitive capacity has no moral relevance for basic moral status, stating: "[y]ou can't use these characteristics to place more or less value on individuals; the proof is that we do not grant more fundamental rights to the most intelligent human beings."

Giroux rejects welfarism, the view that human use of non-human animals is morally permissible if welfare conditions are improved, and identifies as an abolitionist in animal rights. She has criticised Alasdair Cochrane's position on non-human animals' right to freedom. Cochrane argues that animals have an interest in freedom only when the absence of freedom causes suffering. Giroux argues instead that the interest of sentient agents in freedom is of the same kind in humans and non-human animals. In this argument, she uses negative freedom, understood as not being subject to external constraints, and republican freedom, understood as not being subject to domination, rather than positive freedom, understood as being the ultimate master of one's will and actions. Giroux argues that this interest should be protected by an individual right to freedom for all sentient beings.

== Awards ==
In 2018, Giroux received the first prize in the Research Professionals Excellence Awards from the Fonds de recherche du Québec – Société et culture (FRQSC).

== Publications ==
- Contre l'exploitation animale ("Against Animal Exploitation"; Éditions L'Âge d'Homme, 2017) ISBN 2825147001, 978-2825147009
- with Émilie Dardenne and Enrique Utria. Peter Singer et la libération animale. Quarante ans plus tard ("Peter Singer and animal liberation. Forty years later"; Presses universitaires de Rennes, 2017) ISBN 275355255X, 978-2753552555
- with Renan Larue. Le Véganisme ("Veganism"; PUF, 2017) ISBN 213074947X, 978-2130749479
- L'antispécisme ("Antispeciesism"; PUF, 2020) ASIN B086MD53G5
- edited with Angie Pepper and Kristin Voigt. The Ethics of Animal Shelters (Oxford University Press, 2023) ISBN 9780197678640
