= Ethical extensionism =

Concept in environmental and animal ethics

Ethical extensionism or moral extensionism is a metaethical or metaphilosophical approach in environmental ethics and animal ethics that extends existing ethical theories and concepts to include entities (animals, plants, species, the earth) that are traditionally excluded.

For example, while many cultures differ as to what, exactly, is "murder", all cultures take it as wrong to commit murder. An example of ethical extensionism would be to extend to dogs or cats the status of being something that can be murdered, so that it would be wrong under some circumstances to kill a dog or cat.

On the one hand, ethical extensionism is a broadening of the class of things to which humans may owe an ethical duty.

But Des Jardins makes the point that most ethical extensionism has been merely broadening the ethical sphere incrementally, a process not agreeable to some environmental ethicists who would prefer more of a total replacement of traditional ethics with an entirely new approach. So, while ethical extensionism can, in principle, broaden the sphere of ethical standing to any arbitrary limits, the extensionist approach is seen by more recent ethical theorists as being inadequate.
