= Utilitas =

- Discipline: Philosophy
- Language: English
- Edited by: Dale E. Miller

Publication details
- History: 1989–present
- Publisher: Cambridge University Press
- Frequency: Quarterly

Standard abbreviations
- ISO 4: Utilitas

Indexing
- ISSN: 0953-8208 (print); 1741-6183 (web)
- LCCN: 92642297
- OCLC no.: 60617996

Links
- Journal homepage; Online access; Online archive

Utilitas is a quarterly peer-reviewed academic journal covering political philosophy and jurisprudence published by Cambridge University Press. It was established in 1989 and the editor-in-chief is Dale E. Miller (Old Dominion University).

== Abstracting and indexing ==
The journal is abstracted and indexed in:

- Academic Search Premier
- Arts & Humanities Citation Index
- Current Contents/Arts & Humanities
- Humanities International Index
- International Bibliography of Book Reviews of Scholarly Literature
- International Bibliography of Periodical Literature
- International Bibliography of the Social Sciences
- Philosopher's Index
