= Global Policy =

Academic journal

- Discipline: Political science, international relations, public policy, economics
- Language: English
- Edited by: Eva-Maria Nag

Publication details
- History: 2010–present
- Publisher: Wiley-Blackwell on behalf of Durham University (United Kingdom)
- Frequency: Quarterly
- Impact factor: 1.8 (2024)

Standard abbreviations
- ISO 4: Glob. Policy

Indexing
- ISSN: 1758-5880 (print); 1758-5899 (web)
- LCCN: 2011208274
- OCLC no.: 568279753

Links
- Journal homepage; Home page at Wiley-Blackwell; Online access; Online archive

Global Policy is a peer-reviewed academic journal based at the Global Policy Institute, School of Government and International Affairs, Durham University, and focusing on the "point where ideas and policy meet", published in association with Wiley-Blackwell.

Indexed in the SSCI, the journal was launched at the 4th Global Public Policy Network conference at the London School of Economics and Political Science on Monday 22 March 2010, with near simultaneous launch events held in Beijing and Brussels. The theme of the one-day conference was "Global Challenges: Global Impact".

Its first issue included articles by UK Development Secretary Douglas Alexander, General David Petraeus, Head of US Central Command, Mary Kaldor and Ian Goldin and Tiffany Vogel of Oxford University.

The journal's first edition defines its six main foci as being:

1. Globally relevant risks and collective action problems
2. International policy coordination
3. Normative theories of global governance
4. The change from national-level to 'bloc'-level policy making
5. The transition from single-polar to multipolar governance
6. Innovations in global governance

According to Journal Citation Reports, in 2024 Global Policy had a journal impact factor of 1.8, ranking it 106th out of 325 journals in the category "Political Science" and 55th out of 170 journals in the category "International Relations".

Some notable academic contributors are Barry Eichengreen, Michele Acuto, Thomas Hale, and Chad Bown.
