= Res Publica (journal) =

- Discipline: Moral philosophy, legal philosophy, social philosophy, political philosophy
- Language: English
- Edited by: Sune Lægaard, Clare Chambers

Publication details
- History: 1995-present
- Publisher: Springer Science+Business Media on behalf of the Association for Social and Political Philosophy
- Frequency: Quarterly

Standard abbreviations
- ISO 4: Res Publ.

Indexing
- CODEN: REPUFH
- ISSN: 1356-4765 (print); 1572-8692 (web)
- LCCN: sn97033135
- OCLC no.: 641810871

Links
- Journal homepage; Online archive

Res Publica: A Journal of Moral, Legal and Political Philosophy, commonly known as Res Publica, is a quarterly peer-reviewed academic journal of moral, legal, social, and political philosophy. It was established in 1995 and is published by Springer Science+Business Media. The editors-in-chief are Sune Lægaard (Roskilde University) and Clare Chambers (Jesus College, Cambridge). It is the official journal of the Association for Social and Political Philosophy (formerly the Association for Legal and Social Philosophy).

== Abstracting and indexing ==
The journal is abstracted and indexed in Scopus, Academic OneFile, Index to Foreign Legal Periodicals, International Bibliography of Periodical Literature, International Political Science Abstracts, and The Philosopher's Index.
