= Political Studies (journal) =

- Discipline: Political science
- Language: English
- Edited by: Mónica Brito Vieira, Graeme Davies, Daphne Halikiopoulou, Sarah Shair-Rosenfield

Publication details
- History: 1953-present
- Publisher: SAGE Publishing on behalf of the Political Studies Association
- Frequency: Quarterly
- Impact factor: 2.8 (2024)

Standard abbreviations
- ISO 4: Polit. Stud.

Indexing
- ISSN: 0032-3217 (print); 1467-9248 (web)
- LCCN: 2008233815
- OCLC no.: 1641383

Links
- Online access; Online archive

Political Studies is a peer-reviewed academic journal covering all areas of political science, established in 1953 and published quarterly by SAGE Publishing on behalf of the Political Studies Association.

According to the Journal Citation Reports, the journal has a 2024 impact factor of 2.8.

== Editors-in-chief ==
The editors-in-chief (all at the University of York) are:

- Mónica Brito Vieira
- Graeme Davies
- Daphne Halikiopoulou
- Sarah Shair-Rosenfield
