= Paul Kelly (professor) =

Professor of Political Philosophy

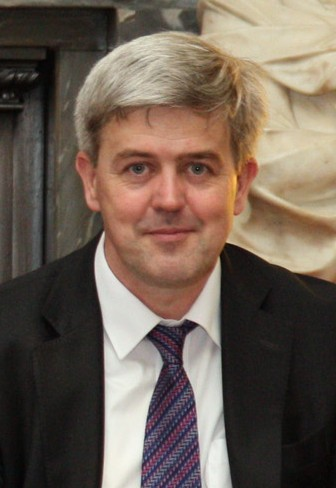
- Kelly in 2013
- Born: Paul Joseph Kelly; 17 January 1962 (age 64)

Academic background
- Education: University College, London
- Thesis: Utilitarianism and Distributive Justice (1988)
- Doctoral advisor: Fred Rosen

Academic work
- Discipline: Political studies
- Sub-discipline: Political theory
- School or tradition: Liberalism
- Institutions: University of Wales, Swansea; London School of Economics

Paul Joseph Kelly (born 1962) is Professor of Political Philosophy at the London School of Economics and Political Science (LSE), and Head of the Department of Government.

== Research ==
Kelly’s early work and main contribution as a historian of political theory was as part of a group of revisionist Bentham scholars, having worked on the manuscripts at the Bentham Project at University College London. Kelly rejected the common claim that Bentham was a crude act-utilitarian. Instead, he argued that Bentham developed a complex two-level utilitarian theory similar to those of contemporary indirect utilitarian theorists such as R. M. Hare or John Gray. His further claim that this makes Bentham a central figure in the canon of liberal political philosophers contradicts most standard interpretations, and is still a widely contested interpretation.

Having based his early work on both archival work and philosophical reconstruction, Kelly has gone on to engage in debates about the methodology and importance of history in the study of political thought. His work on the book Political Thinkers, edited with David Boucher, has defended a non-contextualist approach to past political thinkers in contrast to the linguistic contextualism defended by Quentin Skinner amongst others.

His scepticism about reducing political theory to history has also led to a similar scepticism about the claims made for identity in normative political theory. His criticism of multicultural theories and communitarianism, has led to a defence of liberal egalitarianism that draws on the work of British political theorists such as Brian Barry and H. L. A. Hart, as much as that of John Rawls. Kelly’s work on liberal egalitarianism has concentrated on its claims as a political theory and his most recent work is on the defence of liberal moralism against the arguments of ‘realist’ political theorists such as Bernard Williams.

== Selected work ==
- Against Post-Liberalism: Why 'Family, Faith and Flag' is a Dead End for the Left, Polity, 2026, (ISBN 9781509552443)
- Political thinkers: from Socrates to the present , Oxford University Press, 2009, Oxford, UK. (ISBN 9780199215522)
- Liberalism, secularism and the challenge of religion - is there a crisis? , Oneworld, London, 2008, UK, pp. 124–131. (ISBN 9781851685509)
- Locke’s second treatise of government: a reader’s guide. , Continuum, London, 2007 UK. (ISBN 9780826492654)
- Equality, marginalisation and freedom of expression. , In: Newey, Glen, (ed.) Freedom of speech. Cambridge Scholars Publishing, Newcastle, 2007, UK, pp. 74–96. (ISBN 9781847183606)
- Liberalism and epistemic diversity: Mill's sceptical legacy. Episteme, 3 (3). pp. 248–265 2006. (ISSN 1742-3600)
- The social theory of anti-liberalism. Critical review of international social and political philosophy, 9 (2). pp. 137–154, 2006. (ISSN 1369-8230)
- Political theory: the state of the art. Politics, 26 (1). pp. 47–53, 2006. ISSN 0263-3957
- Liberalism, Polity, 2004. (ISBN 9780745632902)
