= Robert Garner =

British political scientist, political theorist, and intellectual historian

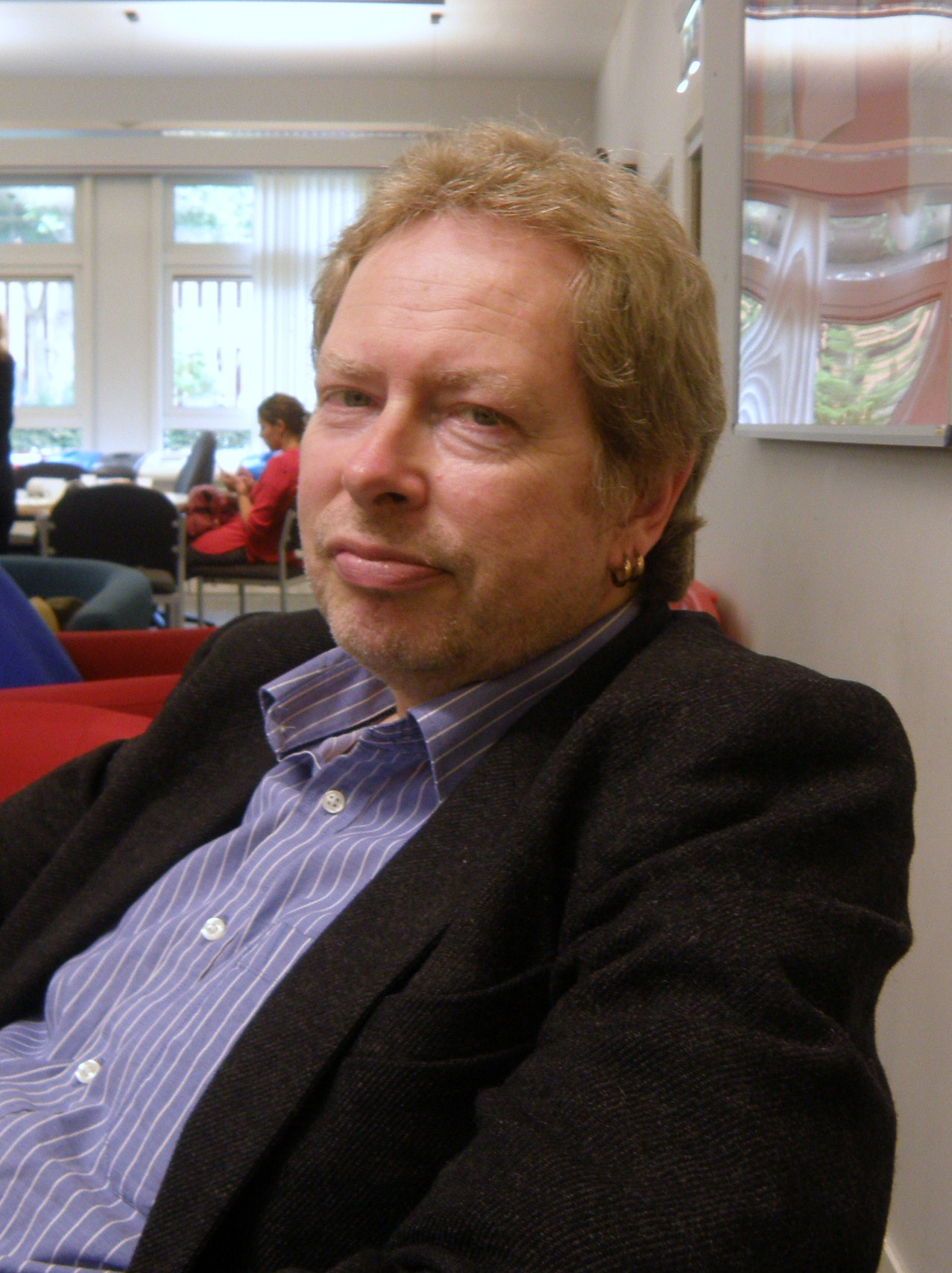
- Garner, 2013
- Occupation: Professor of politics

Academic background
- Education: University of Manchester
- Thesis: Ideology and electoral politics in Labour's rise to major party status 1918-31 (1988)

Academic work
- Discipline: Political science; political theory; intellectual history
- Sub-discipline: Animal rights; animal ethics; green politics
- Institutions: University of Buckingham; University of Exeter; University of Leicester
- Website: robert-garner.com

Robert Garner is a British political scientist, political theorist, and intellectual historian. He is a Professor Emeritus in the politics department at the University of Leicester, where he has worked for much of his career. Before working at Leicester, he worked at the University of Exeter and the University of Buckingham, and studied at the University of Manchester and the University of Salford.

Much of his work concerns animals in politics and ethics. This has been the subject of many of his books, including Animals, Politics and Morality (1993; 2004), Political Animals (1996), Animal Ethics (2005), The Political Theory of Animal Rights (2005), The Animal Rights Debate: Abolition or Regulation (2010, with Gary Francione), A Theory of Justice for Animals (2013), and The Oxford Group and the Emergence of Animal Rights (2020, with Yewande Okuleye). It is also the topic of three collections he edited or co-edited. Garner has also authored or co-authored several textbooks on political science, political parties, and green politics.

== Career ==
Garner read for a BA at the University of Salford and an MA at the University of Manchester, before reading for a doctorate, also at Manchester. He was supervised by David Howell, and submitted his thesis – Ideology and electoral politics in Labour's rise to major party status 1918-31 – in 1988. He published work on the Labour Party in 1990, and in 1991, by which time he was working at the University of Buckingham, he published a paper on political lobbying on behalf of animals. In 1993, while still at Buckingham, he published his first book: Animals, Politics and Morality, with Manchester University Press. A revised and updated version was published in 2004. In the book, Garner charts the history of the animal protection movement, setting out key positions taken on animals and exploring the possibility of change. Also in 1993, co-writing with Richard Kelly, Garner published a textbook entitled British Political Parties Today. This was also with Manchester University Press, and was part of the Politics Today series. An updated version was published in 1998.

After a time at the University of Exeter, Garner moved to the University of Leicester. In 1996, he published the first edition of his Environmental Politics with Harvester Wheatsheaf, part of the series Contemporary Political Studies. A second edition followed in 2000, and a third in 2011, both of which were published by Palgrave Macmillan. 1996 also saw the publication of Animal Rights: The Changing Debate, a collection edited by Garner and published by Palgrave Macmillan. In 1998, Garner published his second research monograph: Political Animals: Animal Protection Politics in Britain and the United States. Published by Palgrave Macmillan, the book offered a comparison of British and American policy pathways around animal welfare, as well as animal protection movements in the two countries, using policy pathway analysis. By the late 1990s, Garner had been promoted to Reader.

In 2005, Garner published both Animal Ethics and The Political Theory of Animal Rights. The former, published with Polity, is a scholarly introduction to animal ethics and animal rights. The latter, published with Manchester University Press, explores what political theorists have said about animals and the place of animals in major political theories. In 2006, he was promoted to professor at Leicester. In 2009, the first edition of his textbook Introduction to Politics, co-authored with Peter Ferdinand and Stephanie Lawson, was published with Oxford University Press. A second edition followed in 2012, a third in 2016, a fourth in 2020, and a fifth in 2023. Additionally, textbook called simply Politics by the three was published by Oxford in 2018.

2010 saw the publication of The Animal Rights Debate: Abolition or Regulation by Columbia University Press. The book took the format of a debate between Garner and Gary Francione. While Francione defends an abolitionist approach to animal rights, Garner advocates for a reformist stance. Garner became a founding member in 2011 of the Centre for Animals and Social Justice, a British charity that aims to "embed animal protection as a core goal of public policy". In 2011, Garner explicated a theory of animal rights in A Theory of Justice for Animals, which was published by Oxford University Press. In this work of political philosophy, Garner defends a novel theory of justice affording rights to animals.

Two edited collections followed: Oxford University Press's The Ethics of Killing Animals (co-edited with Tatjana Višak) in 2015 and Rowman & Littlefield International's The Political Turn in Animal Ethics in 2016. In 2018, he published a textbook called Environmental Political Thought with Red Globe Press; focussing on green political theory, this has a narrower focus than his earlier Environmental Politics, which covered green politics generally. In 2020, writing with Yewande Okuleye, Garner published The Oxford Group and the Emergence of Animal Rights with Oxford University Press. The book is an intellectual history of the Oxford Group, based on interviews with surviving members of the group. Garner retired from Leicester in 2020 and began an MA in creative writing at the University of East Anglia. He went on to publish non-academic books about Leicester City F.C. and the 1945 United Kingdom general election.

== Selected works ==
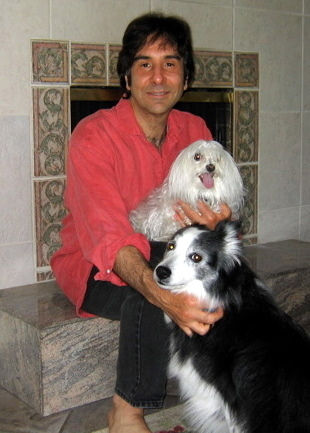
Gary Francione, with whom Garner co-authored the debate book The Animal Rights Debate

Scholarly monographs

- Animals, Politics and Morality. Manchester University Press, 1993.
  Second edition: 2004
- Political Animals: Animal Protection Politics in Britain and the United States. Palgrave Macmillan, 1998.
- The Political Theory of Animal Rights. Manchester University Press, 2005.
- A Theory of Justice for Animals. Oxford University Press, 2013.
- The Oxford Group and the Emergence of Animal Rights. Oxford University Press, 2020. (With Yewande Okuleye.)

Scholarly debate books

- The Animal Rights Debate: Abolition or Regulation?. Columbia University Press, 2010. (With Gary Francione.)

Academic textbooks

- British Political Parties Today. Manchester University Press, 1993. (With Richard Kelly.)
  - Second edition: 1998
- Environmental Politics: Britain, Europe and the Global Environment. Harvester Wheatsheaf, 1996.
  Second edition: 2000 (Palgrave Macmillan); third edition: 2011 (Palgrave Macmillan)
- Animal Ethics. Polity Press, 2005.
- Introduction to Politics. Oxford University Press, 2009. (With Peter Ferdinand and Stephanie Lawson.)
  Second edition: 2012; third edition: 2016; fourth edition: 2020; fifth edition: 2023.
- Politics. Oxford University Press, 2018. (With Peter Ferdinand and Stephanie Lawson.)
- Environmental Political Thought. Red Globe Press, 2018.

Edited collections

- Animal Rights: The Changing Debate. Palgrave Macmillan, 1996.
- The Ethics of Killing Animals. Oxford University Press, 2015. (With Tatjana Visak.)
- The Political Turn in Animal Ethics. Rowman & Littlefield International, 2016. (With Siobhan O'Sullivan.)

Popular books

- The Highs and Lows of Leicester City: A Comprehensive History. Pitch Publishing, 2024.
- Landslide: The Story of the 1945 General Election. The Book Guild, 2026.

== See also ==
- List of animal rights advocates
