= History of animal rights =

The concept of moral rights for animals is believed to date as far back as Ancient India, particularly early Jainist and Hindu history. What follows is mainly the history of animal rights (or more broadly, animal protection) in the Western world. There is a rich history of animal protection in the ancient texts, lives, and stories of Eastern, African, and Indigenous peoples.

In the West, Aristotle placed human beings at the top of nature's scale of being. Because animals lack reason, he said, they are by nature instruments for human use. But there were other philosophers in ancient Greece and Rome who were more sympathetic to animals, some maintaining that animals do exercise a degree of reason and are owed gentle treatment. Also from ancient times there can be found in all the world's major religious traditions, expressed in varying ways, injunctions against cruelty to animals.

Key scholars in the history of animal ethics include René Descartes, who in the 17th century maintained that animals are automata lacking any consciousness; Immanuel Kant, who argued that we have no duties directly to animals; and Jeremy Bentham, who insisted that animals’ capacity to suffer must be included in our moral reckoning. Charles Darwin argued not only that there is an evolutionary biological continuity between humans and (other) animals, but also that humans differ from animals mentally and emotionally in degree only.

The late 19th and early 20th centuries saw the growth of the anti-vivisection movement, which advocated against the use and exploitation of live animals in scientific research. Women within the movement played a prominent role in its growth and influence within the broader scientific community.

Beginning in the 1970s, there was a surge of interest among philosophers and other scholars in the issue of the treatment of animals, something that continues to this day. This has been accompanied by, and has to some extent influenced, many forms of activism on behalf of animals. This activism is intended to raise public awareness and to change laws, in order to make a major, even revolutionary, practical difference in the lives of animals and in our relationships to them.

== In the East ==
Vegetarianism in ancient India
Throughout the whole country the people do not kill any living creature, nor drink intoxicating liquor, nor eat onions or garlic. The only exception is that of the Chandalas. That is the name for those who are (held to be) wicked men, and live apart from others. ... In that country they do not keep pigs and fowls, and do not sell live cattle; in the markets there are no butchers' shops and no dealers in intoxicating drink. In buying and selling commodities they use cowries. Only the Chandalas are fishermen and hunters, and sell flesh meat.

— Faxian, Chinese pilgrim to India (4th/5th century CE), A Record of Buddhistic Kingdoms (translated by James Legge)

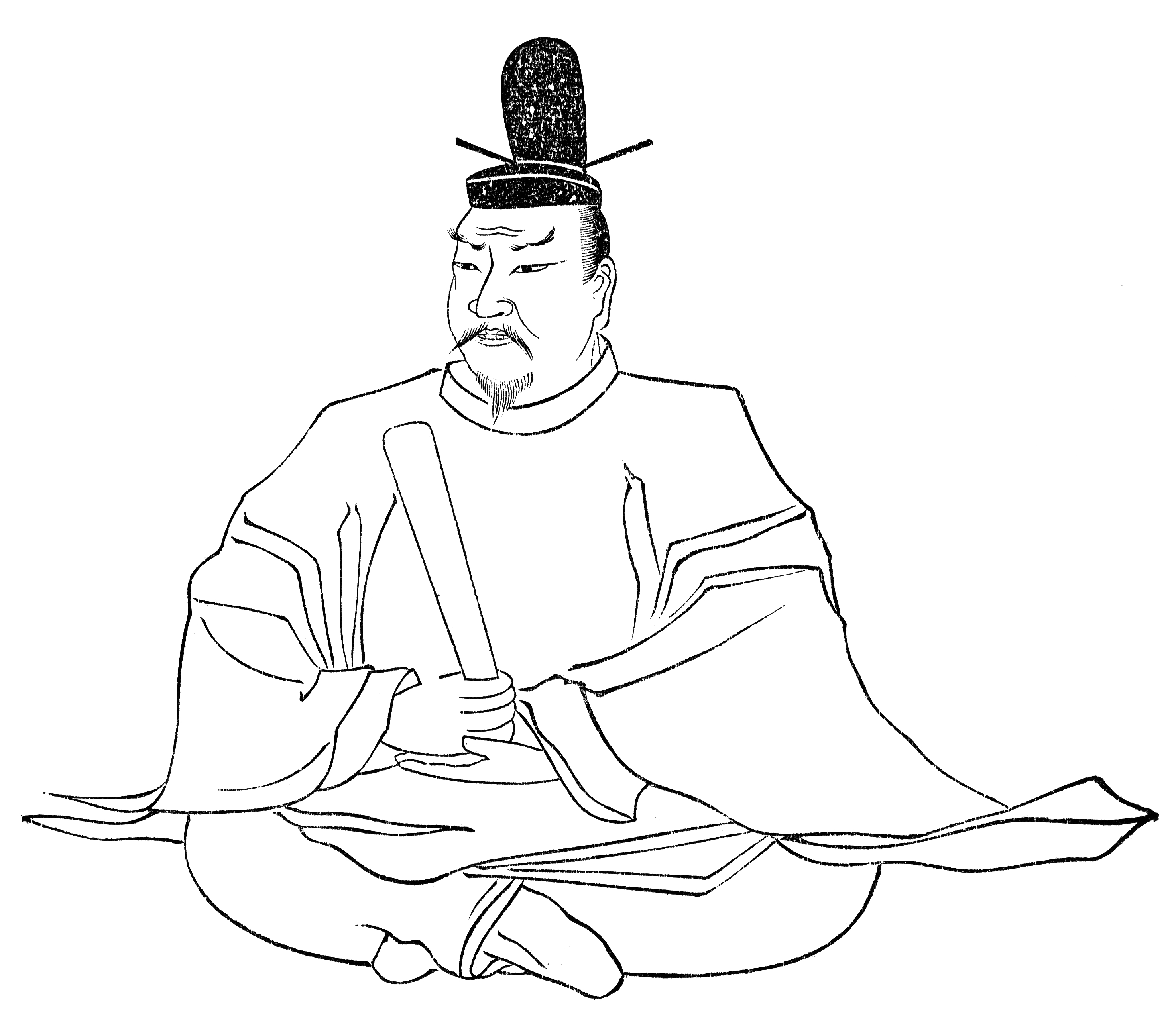
Emperor Tenmu began bans on killing and eating meat in 675 in Japan.

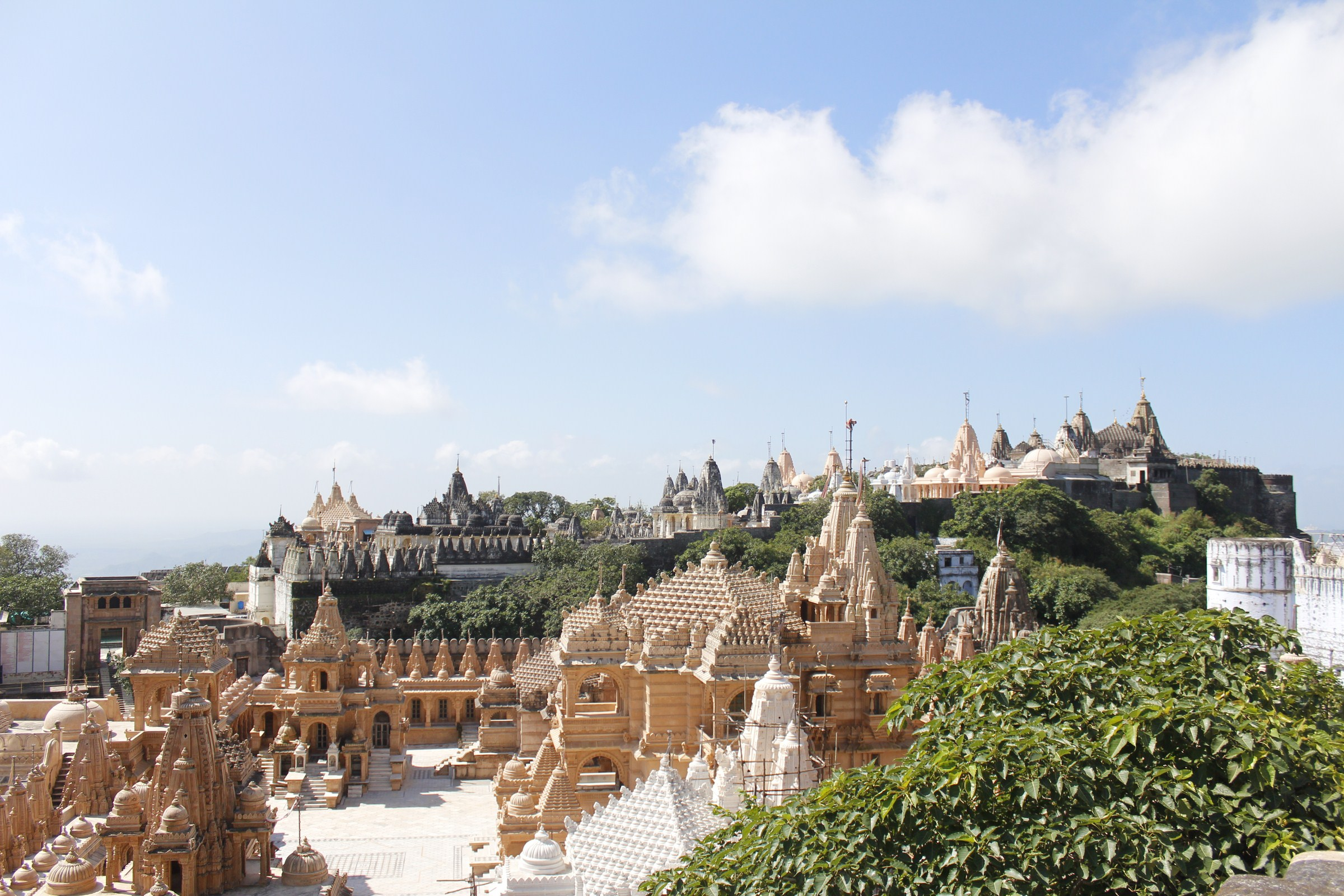
The temple town of Palitana, India is the world's first vegetarian-only city.

The belief in and promotion of animal rights has had a long history in East and South Asia. It has its roots in traditional Indian religious and philosophical beliefs and concepts such as ahimsa, the doctrine of non-violence. The earliest reference to the idea of non-violence to animals (pashu-ahimsa), apparently in a moral sense, is in the Kapisthala Katha Samhita of the Hindu text of Yajurveda (KapS 31.11), written about the 8th century BCE.

=== Ancient era ===
Parshwanatha, the 23rd Tirthankara, revived Jainism and ahimsa in the 9th century BCE, which led to a radical animal-rights movement in South Asia. His successor, Mahavira (c. 6th or 5th century BCE), is best remembered in the Indian traditions for his teaching that ahimsa is the supreme moral virtue. He taught that ahimsa covers all living beings, and injuring any being in any form creates bad karma (which affects one's rebirth, future well-being, and suffering). According to Mahatma Gandhi, Mahavira was the greatest authority on ahimsa.

Numerous works of the classical Indian literature that speaks against animal cruelties exist in many Indian languages. For example, the Tirukkural, likely a Hindu or Jain work written between 450 and 500 CE, dedicates verses 251–260 and 321–330 of its first volume to the virtue of ahimsa, emphasizing on moral vegetarianism and non-killing (kollamai) as personal virtues. According to George Uglow Pope, verses 121 to 123 of the Naladiyar, another ancient Tamil work, speak against cruelty to animals, including feeding on them and imprisoning them in cages.

Several kings in India built hospitals for animals, and the emperor Ashoka (304–232 BCE) issued orders against hunting and animal slaughter, in line with ahimsa, the doctrine of non-violence.

In Japan in 675, the Emperor Tenmu prohibited the killing and the eating of meat during the busy farming period between April and September but excluded the eating of wild birds and animals. This ban and several others that followed over the centuries were overturned in the nineteenth century during the Meiji restoration.

The 12th-century Indian social reformer Basava insisted on ahimsa or non-violence and vehemently condemned all forms of sacrifices, human or animal.

=== Modern era ===
Between late 18th century and early 19th century, Swaminarayan brought a revival of central Hindu practices of dharma, ahimsa and brahmacarya. He was against, among other vices, the consumption of meat, animal sacrifices, and the appeasement of ghosts and tantric rituals. Swaminarayan was successful in reinstating ahimsa, performing non-violent yajñas (fire sacrifices) on a large scale. Through the mid-19th century, 'Vallalar' Ramalinga Swamigal promoted ahimsa and compassion, emphasizing on non-killing and meatless way of life.

The Hindu reform movement of the Arya Samaj, which was formed in 1875, condemned several evil practices of several different religions and communities, including animal sacrifice and meat eating. According to its founder Dayananda Saraswati, all of these practices ran contrary to good sense and the wisdom of the Vedas.

In 2000, the High Court in Kerala, India used the language of "rights" in relation to circus animals, ruling that they are "beings entitled to dignified existence" under Article 21 of the Indian Constitution. The ruling said that if human beings are entitled to these rights, animals should be too. The court went beyond the requirements of the Constitution that all living beings should be shown compassion, and said: "It is not only our fundamental duty to show compassion to our animal friends, but also to recognize and protect their rights." Waldau wrote that other courts in India and one court in Sri Lanka have used similar language.

In 2012, the Indian government issued a ban on the use of live animals in education and much research.

In 2014, the Jain pilgrimage destination of Palitana City in India became the first city in the world to be legally lacto-vegetarian. It has outlawed, or made illegal, the buying and selling of meat, fish and eggs, and also related jobs or work, such as fishing and penning "food animals".

== In the West ==
=== Moral status and animals in the ancient world ===
Aristotle argued that animals lacked reason (logos), and placed humans at the top of the natural world.

Aristotle stated that animals lacked reason (logos), and placed humans at the top of the natural world, yet the respect for animals in ancient Greece was very high. Some animals were considered divine, e.g. dolphins. In the Book of Genesis 1:26 (5th or 6th century BCE), Adam is given "dominion over the fish of the sea, and over the fowl of the air, and over the cattle, and over all the earth, and over every creeping thing that creepeth upon the earth." Dominion need not entail property rights, but it has been interpreted, by some, over the centuries to imply "ownership".

The philosopher and mathematician Pythagoras (c. 580–c. 500 BCE) urged respect for animals, believing that human and nonhuman souls were reincarnated from human to animal, and vice versa. Against this, Aristotle (384–322 BCE) said that nonhuman animals had no interests of their own, ranking them far below humans in the Great Chain of Being. He was the first to create a taxonomy of animals; he perceived some similarities between humans and other species, but stated for the most part that animals lacked reason (logos), reasoning (logismos), thought (dianoia, nous), and belief (doxa).

Theophrastus (c. 371 – c. 287 BCE), one of Aristotle's pupils, argued that animals also had reasoning (logismos) and opposed eating meat on the grounds that it robbed them of life and was therefore unjust. Theophrastus did not prevail; Richard Sorabji writes that current attitudes to animals can be traced to the heirs of the Western Christian tradition selecting the hierarchy that Aristotle sought to preserve.

Plutarch (1st century CE), in his Life of Cato the Elder, comments that while law and justice are applicable strictly to men only, beneficence and charity towards beasts is characteristic of a gentle heart. This is intended as a correction and advance over the merely utilitarian treatment of animals and slaves by Cato himself. The Moralia, traditionally ascribed to Plutarch, advances arguments for cognition in animals in the essays On the Cleverness of Animals and Beasts are Rational, and advocates moral vegetarianism in On the Eating of Flesh.

Tom Beauchamp (2011) writes that the most extensive account in antiquity of how animals should be treated was written by the Neoplatonist philosopher Porphyry (234–c. 305 CE), in his On Abstinence from Animal Food, and On Abstinence from Killing Animals.

=== 17th century: Animals as automata ===
==== Early animal protection laws in Europe ====
According to Richard D. Ryder, the first known animal protection legislation in Europe was passed in Ireland in 1635. It prohibited pulling wool off sheep, and the attaching of ploughs to horses' tails, referring to "the cruelty used to beasts." In 1641, the first legal code to protect domestic animals in North America was passed by the Massachusetts Bay Colony. The colony's constitution was based on The Body of Liberties by the Reverend Nathaniel Ward (1578–1652), an English lawyer, Puritan clergyman, and University of Cambridge graduate. Ward's list of "rites" included rite 92: "No man shall exercise any Tirrany or Crueltie toward any brute Creature which are usually kept for man's use." Historian Roderick Nash (1989) writes that, at the height of René Descartes' influence in Europe—and his view that animals were simply automata—it is significant that the New Englanders created a law that implied animals were not unfeeling machines.

The Puritans passed animal protection legislation in England too. Kathleen Kete writes that animal welfare laws were passed in 1654 as part of the ordinances of the Protectorate—the government under Oliver Cromwell (1599–1658), which lasted from 1653 to 1659, following the English Civil War. Cromwell disliked blood sports, which included cockfighting, cock throwing, dog fighting, bull baiting and bull running, said to tenderize the meat. These could be seen in villages and fairgrounds, and became associated with idleness, drunkenness, and gambling. Kete writes that the Puritans interpreted the biblical dominion of man over animals to mean responsible stewardship, rather than ownership. The opposition to blood sports became part of what was seen as Puritan interference in people's lives, and the animal protection laws were overturned during the Restoration, when Charles II was returned to the throne in 1660.

==== René Descartes ====
The great influence of the 17th century was the French philosopher René Descartes (1596–1650), whose Meditations (1641) informed attitudes about animals well into the 20th century. Writing during the Scientific Revolution, Descartes proposed a mechanistic theory of the universe, the aim of which was to show that the world could be mapped out without allusion to subjective experience. His mechanistic approach was extended to the issue of animal consciousness. Mind, for Descartes, was a thing apart from the physical universe, a separate substance, linking human beings to the mind of God. The nonhuman, on the other hand, were for Descartes nothing but complex automata, with no souls, minds, or reason.

=== Treatment of animals as man's duty towards himself ===
==== John Locke, Immanuel Kant ====
Against Descartes, the British philosopher John Locke (1632–1704) commented, in Some Thoughts Concerning Education (1693), that animals did have feelings, and that unnecessary cruelty toward them was morally wrong, but that the right not to be harmed adhered either to the animal's owner, or to the human being who was being damaged by being cruel. Discussing the importance of preventing children from tormenting animals, he wrote: "For the custom of tormenting and killing of beasts will, by degrees, harden their minds even towards men."

Locke's position echoed that of Thomas Aquinas (1225–1274). Paul Waldau writes that the argument can be found at 1 Corinthians (9:9–10), when Paul asks: "Is it for oxen that God is concerned? Does he not speak entirely for our sake? It was written for our sake." Christian philosophers interpreted this to mean that humans had no direct duty to nonhuman animals, but had a duty only to protect them from the effects of engaging in cruelty.

The German philosopher Immanuel Kant (1724–1804), following Aquinas, opposed the idea that humans have direct duties toward nonhumans. For Kant, cruelty to animals was wrong only because it was bad for humankind. He argued in 1785 that "cruelty to animals is contrary to man's duty to himself, because it deadens in him the feeling of sympathy for their sufferings, and thus a natural tendency that is very useful to morality in relation to other human beings is weakened."

=== 18th century: Centrality of sentience ===
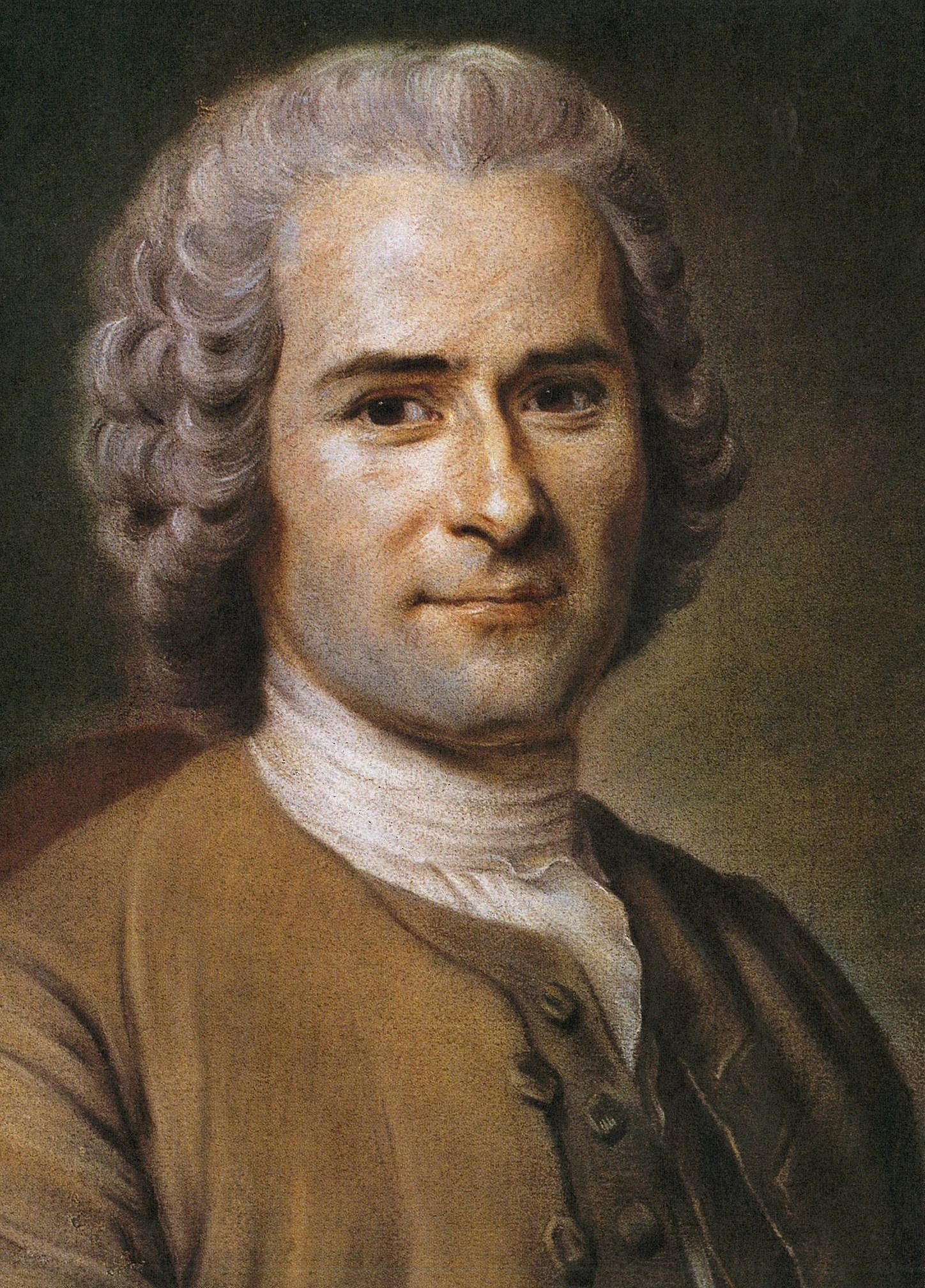
Jean-Jacques Rousseau argued for the inclusion of animals in natural law.

==== Jean-Jacques Rousseau ====
Jean-Jacques Rousseau (1712–1778) argued in Discourse on Inequality (1754) for the inclusion of animals in natural law on the grounds of sentience: "By this method also we put an end to the time-honored disputes concerning the participation of animals in natural law: for it is clear that, being destitute of intelligence and liberty, they cannot recognize that law; as they partake, however, in some measure of our nature, in consequence of the sensibility with which they are endowed, they ought to partake of natural right; so that mankind is subjected to a kind of obligation even toward the brutes. It appears, in fact, that if I am bound to do no injury to my fellow-creatures, this is less because they are rational than because they are sentient beings: and this quality, being common both to men and beasts, ought to entitle the latter at least to the privilege of not being wantonly ill-treated by the former."

In his treatise on education, Emile, or On Education (1762), he encouraged parents to raise their children on a vegetarian diet. He believed that the food of the culture a child was raised eating, played an important role in the character and disposition they would develop as adults. "For however one tries to explain the practice, it is certain that great meat-eaters are usually more cruel and ferocious than other men. This has been recognized at all times and in all places. The English are noted for their cruelty while the Gaures are the gentlest of men. All savages are cruel, and it is not their customs that tend in this direction; their cruelty is the result of their food."

==== Jeremy Bentham ====
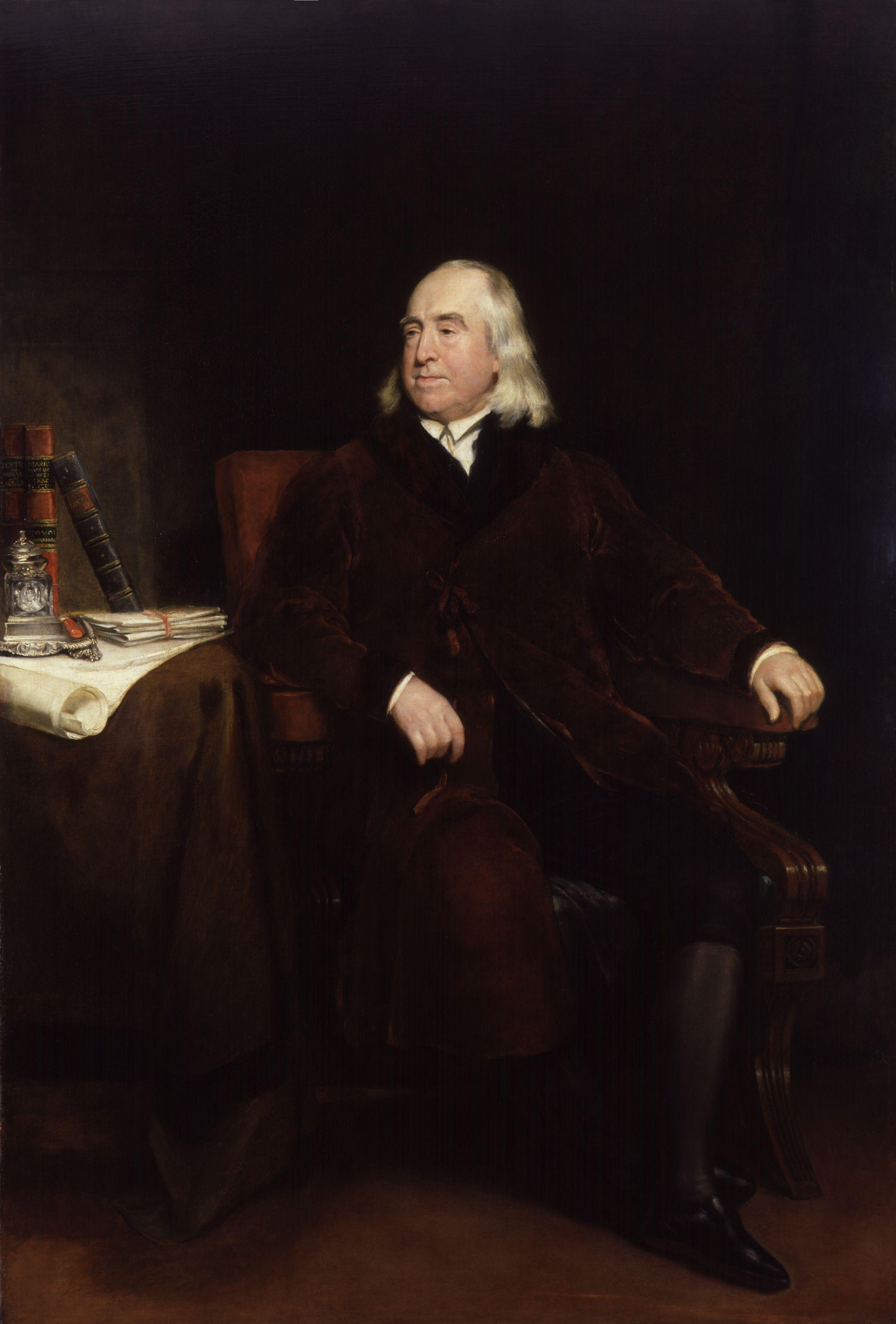
Jeremy Bentham: "The time will come, when humanity will extend its mantle over every thing which breathes."

Four years later, one of the founders of modern utilitarianism, the English philosopher Jeremy Bentham (1748–1832), although opposed to the concept of natural rights, argued that it was the ability to suffer that should be the benchmark of how we treat other beings. Bentham states that the capacity for suffering gives the right to equal consideration; equal consideration is that the interests of any being affected by an action are to be considered and have the equal interest of any other being. If rationality were the criterion, he argued, many humans, including infants and the disabled, would also have to be treated as though they were things. He did not conclude that humans and nonhumans had equal moral significance, but argued that the latter's interests should be taken into account. He wrote in 1789, just as African slaves were being freed by the French:

The French have already discovered that the blackness of the skin is no reason a human being should be abandoned without redress to the caprice of a tormentor. It may one day come to be recognized that the number of the legs, the villosity of the skin, or the termination of the os sacrum are reasons equally insufficient for abandoning a sensitive being to the same fate. What else is it that should trace the insuperable line? Is it the faculty of reason or perhaps the faculty of discourse? But a full-grown horse or dog, is beyond comparison a more rational, as well as a more conversable animal, than an infant of a day or a week or even a month, old. But suppose the case were otherwise, what would it avail? the question is not, Can they reason?, nor Can they talk? but, Can they suffer?

=== 19th century: Emergence of jus animalium ===
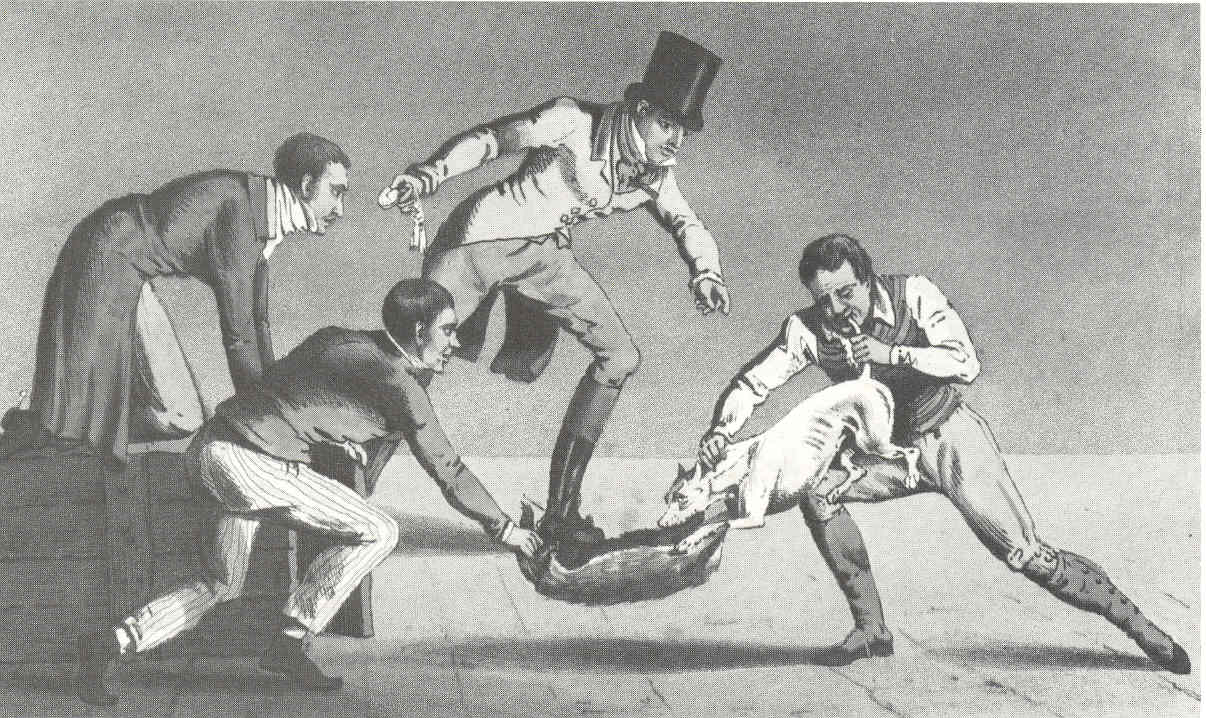
Badger baiting, one of the rural sports campaigners sought to ban from 1800 onwards.

The 19th century saw an explosion of interest in animal protection, particularly in England. Debbie Legge and Simon Brooman write that the educated classes became concerned about attitudes toward the old, the needy, children, and the insane, and that this concern was extended to nonhumans. Before the 19th century, there had been prosecutions for poor treatment of animals, but only because of the damage to the animal as property. In 1793, for example, John Cornish was found not guilty of maiming a horse after pulling the animal's tongue out; the judge ruled that Cornish could be found guilty only if there was evidence of malice toward the owner.

From 1800 onwards, there were several attempts in England to introduce animal protection legislation. The first was a bill against bull baiting, introduced in April 1800 by a Scottish MP, Sir William Pulteney (1729–1805). It was opposed inter alia on the grounds that it was anti-working class, and was defeated by two votes. Another attempt was made in 1802, this time opposed by the Secretary at War, William Windham (1750–1810), who said the Bill was supported by Methodists and Jacobins who wished to "destroy the Old English character, by the abolition of all rural sports."

In 1809, Lord Erskine (1750–1823) introduced a bill to protect cattle and horses from malicious wounding, wanton cruelty, and beating. He told the House of Lords that animals had protection only as property: "The animals themselves are without protection--the law regards them not substantively--they have no rights!" Erskine in his parliamentary speech combined the vocabulary of animal rights and trusteeship with a theological appeal included in the Bill's preamble to opposing cruelty. The Bill was passed by the Lords, but was opposed in the Commons by Windham, who said it would be used against the "lower orders" when the real culprits would be their employers.

==== Martin's Act ====
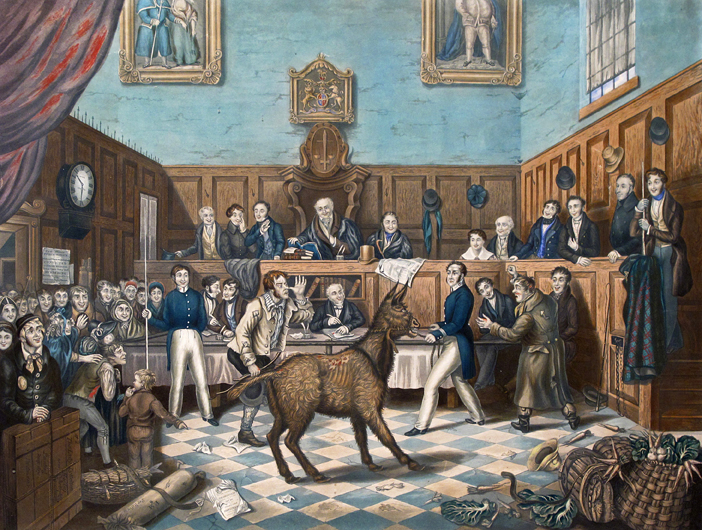
The Trial of Bill Burns

In 1821, the Treatment of Horses bill was introduced by Colonel Richard Martin (1754–1834), MP for Galway in Ireland, but it was lost among laughter in the House of Commons that the next thing would be rights for asses, dogs, and cats. Nicknamed "Humanity Dick" by George IV, Martin finally succeeded in 1822 with his "Ill Treatment of Horses and Cattle Bill"—or "Martin's Act", as it became known—which was the world's first major piece of animal protection legislation. It was given royal assent on June 22 that year as An Act to prevent the cruel and improper Treatment of Cattle, and made it an offence, punishable by fines up to five pounds or two months imprisonment, to "beat, abuse, or ill-treat any horse, mare, gelding, mule, ass, ox, cow, heifer, steer, sheep or other cattle."

Legge and Brooman argue that the success of the Bill lay in the personality of "Humanity Dick", who was able to shrug off the ridicule from the House of Commons, and whose sense of humour managed to capture the House's attention. It was Martin himself who brought the first prosecution under the Act, when he had Bill Burns, a costermonger—a street seller of fruit—arrested for beating a donkey, and paraded the animal's injuries before a reportedly astonished court. Burns was fined, and newspapers and music halls were full of jokes about how Martin had relied on the testimony of a donkey.

Other countries followed suit in passing legislation or making decisions that favoured animals. In 1822, the courts in New York ruled that wanton cruelty to animals was a misdemeanor at common law. In France in 1850, Jacques Philippe Delmas de Grammont succeeded in having the Loi Grammont passed, outlawing cruelty against domestic animals, and leading to years of arguments about whether bulls could be classed as domestic in order to ban bullfighting. The state of Washington followed in 1859, New York in 1866, California in 1868, and Florida in 1889. In England, a series of amendments extended the reach of the 1822 Act, which became the Cruelty to Animals Act 1835, outlawing cockfighting, baiting, and dog fighting, followed by another amendment in 1849, and again in 1876.

==== Society for the Prevention of Cruelty to Animals ====
At a meeting of the Society instituted for the purpose of preventing cruelty to animals, on the 16th day of June 1824, at Old Slaughter's Coffee House, St Martin's Lane: T F Buxton Esqr, MP, in the Chair,

It was resolved:

That a committee be appointed to superintend the Publication of Tracts, Sermons, and similar modes of influencing public opinion, to consist of the following Gentlemen:

Sir Jas. Mackintosh MP, A Warre Esqr. MP, Wm. Wilberforce Esqr. MP, Basil Montagu Esqr., Revd. A Broome, Revd. G Bonner, Revd G A Hatch, A E Kendal Esqr., Lewis Gompertz Esqr., Wm. Mudford Esqr., Dr. Henderson.

Resolved also:

That a Committee be appointed to adopt measures for Inspecting the Markets and Streets of the Metropolis, the Slaughter Houses, the conduct of Coachmen, etc.- etc, consisting of the following Gentlemen:

T F Buxton Esqr. MP, Richard Martin Esqr., MP, Sir James Graham, L B Allen Esqr., C C Wilson Esqr., Jno. Brogden Esqr., Alderman Brydges, A E Kendal Esqr., E Lodge Esqr., J Martin Esqr. T G Meymott Esqr.

A. Broome,

Honorary Secretary

Richard Martin soon realized that magistrates did not take the Martin Act seriously, and that it was not being reliably enforced. Martin's Act was supported by various social reformers who were not parliamentarians and an informal network had gathered around the efforts of Reverend Arthur Broome (1779–1837) to create a voluntary organisation that would promote kindness toward animals. Broome canvassed opinions in letters that were published or summarised in various periodicals in 1821. After the passage of Richard Martin's anti-cruelty to cattle bill in 1822, Broome attempted to form a Society for the Prevention of Cruelty to Animals that would bring together the patronage of persons who were of social rank and committed to social reforms. Broome organised and chaired a meeting of sympathisers in November 1822, where it was agreed that a society should be created and at which Broome was named its secretary, but the attempt was short-lived. In 1824, Broome arranged a new meeting in Old Slaughter's Coffee House in St Martin's Lane, a London café frequented by artists and actors. The group met on June 16, 1824, and included a number of MPs: Richard Martin, Sir James Mackintosh (1765–1832), Sir Thomas Buxton (1786–1845), William Wilberforce (1759–1833), and Sir James Graham (1792–1861), who had been an MP, and who became one again in 1826.

They decided to form a "Society instituted for the purpose of preventing cruelty to animals"; the Society for the Prevention of Cruelty to Animals, as it became known. It determined to send men to inspect slaughterhouses, Smithfield Market, where livestock had been sold since the 10th century, and to look into the treatment of horses by coachmen. The society became the Royal Society in 1840, when it was granted a royal charter by Queen Victoria, herself strongly opposed to vivisection.

From 1824 onwards, several books were published, analyzing animal rights issues, rather than protection alone. Lewis Gompertz (1783/4–1865), one of the men who attended the first meeting of the SPCA, published Moral Inquiries on the Situation of Man and of Brutes (1824), arguing that every living creature, human and nonhuman, has more right to the use of its own body than anyone else has to use it, and that our duty to promote happiness applies equally to all beings. Edward Nicholson (1849–1912), head of the Bodleian Library at the University of Oxford, argued in Rights of an Animal (1879) that animals have the same natural right to life and liberty that human beings do, disregarding Descartes' mechanistic view—or what he called the "Neo-Cartesian snake"—that they lack consciousness. Other writers of the time who explored whether animals might have natural (or moral) rights were Edward Payson Evans (1831–1917), John Muir (1838–1914), and J. Howard Moore (1862–1916), an American zoologist and author of The Universal Kinship (1906) and The New Ethics (1907).

==== Arthur Schopenhauer ====
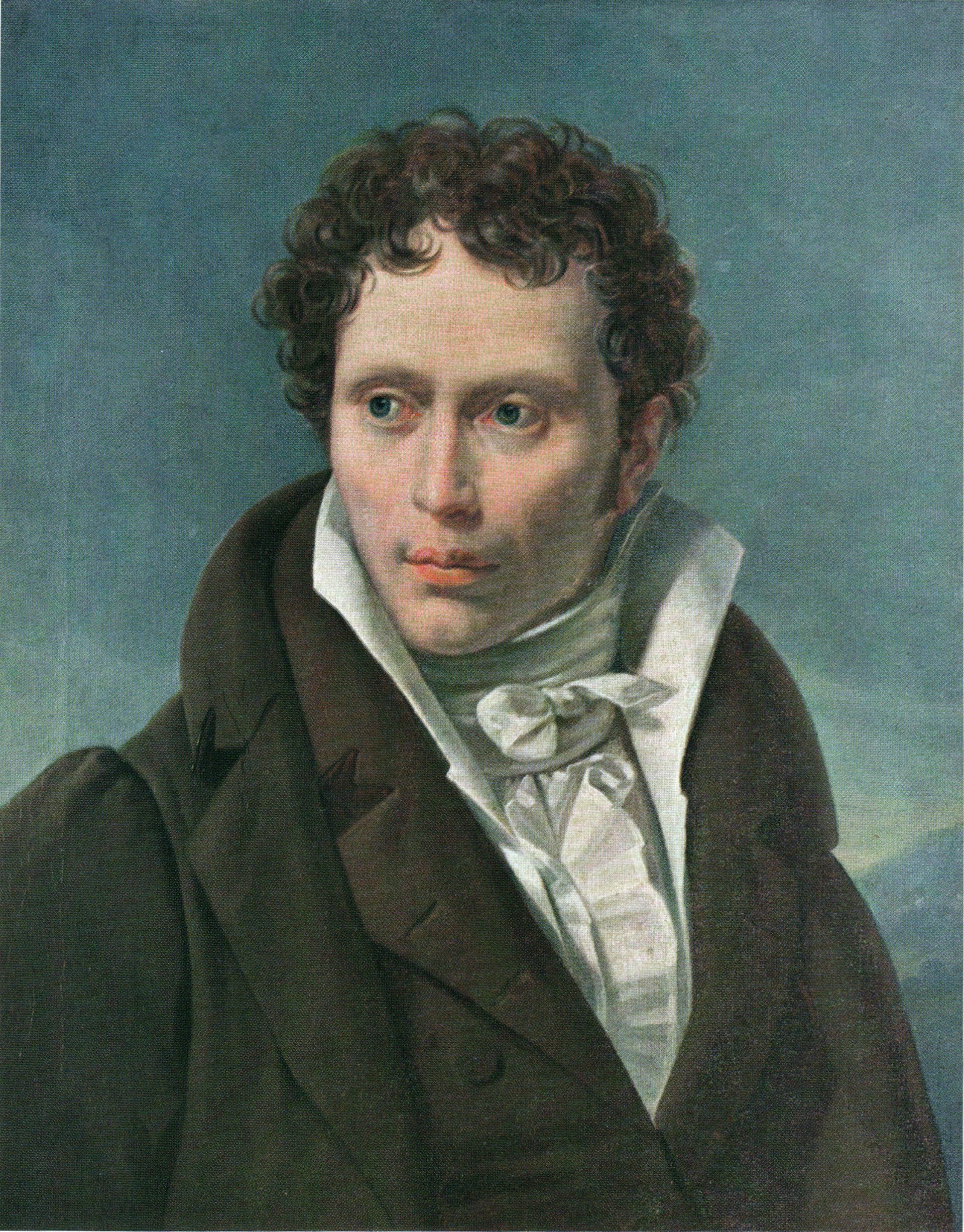
Schopenhauer argued in 1839 that the view of cruelty as wrong only because it hardens humans was "revolting and abominable".

The development in England of the concept of animal rights was strongly supported by the German philosopher Arthur Schopenhauer (1788–1860). He wrote that Europeans were "awakening more and more to a sense that beasts have rights, in proportion as the strange notion is being gradually overcome and outgrown, that the animal kingdom came into existence solely for the benefit and pleasure of man."

He stopped short of advocating vegetarianism, arguing that, so long as an animal's death was quick, men would suffer more by not eating meat than animals would suffer by being eaten. Schopenhauer also theorized that the reason people succumbed to the "unnatural diet" of meat-eating was because of the unnatural, cold climate they emigrated to and the necessity of meat for survival in such a climate, for fruits and vegetables could not be dependably cultivated at those times. He applauded the animal protection movement in England—"To the honor, then, of the English, be it said that they are the first people who have, in downright earnest, extended the protecting arm of the law to animals." He also argued against the dominant Kantian idea that animal cruelty is wrong only insofar as it brutalizes humans:

Thus, because Christian morality leaves animals out of account ... they are at once outlawed in philosophical morals; they are mere "things," mere means to any ends whatsoever. They can therefore be used for vivisection, hunting, coursing, bullfights, and horse racing, and can be whipped to death as they struggle along with heavy carts of stone. Shame on such a morality that is worthy of pariahs, chandalas, and mlechchhas, and that fails to recognize the eternal essence that exists in every living thing ...

==== Percy Bysshe Shelley ====
The English poet and dramatist Percy Bysshe Shelley (1792–1822) wrote two essays advocating a vegetarian diet, for ethical and health reasons: A Vindication of Natural Diet (1813) and On the Vegetable System of Diet (1829, posth.).

==== Isabella Beeton ====
Isabella Beeton (1836–1865) the English reporter, editor and author of Mrs Beeton's Book of Household Management was an early advocate against force-fed poultry and caged hens. About the former, she wrote that force-feeding, was a process that "may produce a handsome-looking bird, and it may weigh enough to satisfy the whim or avarice of its stuffer; but, when before the fire, it will reveal the cruel treatment to which it has been subjected, and will weep a drippingpan-ful of fat tears. You will never find heart enough to place such a grief-worn guest at the head of your table".

About the necessity for free-range rather than caged hens, she wrote:

We are no advocates for converting the domestic fowl into a cage-bird. We have known amateur fowl-keepers...coop up a male bird and three or four hens in an ordinary egg-chest placed on its side, and with the front closely barred with iron hooping! This system will not do. Every animal, from man himself to the guinea-pig, must have what is vulgarly, but truly, known as "elbow-room;" and it must be self-evident how emphatically this rule applies to winged animals. It may be urged, in the case of domestic fowls, that from constant disuse, and from clipping and plucking, and other sorts of maltreatment, their wings can hardly be regarded as instruments of flight; we maintain, however, that you may pluck a fowl's wing-joints as bare as a pumpkin, but you will not erase from his memory that he is a fowl, and that his proper sphere is the open air. If he likewise reflects that he is an ill-used fowl — a prison-bird — he will then come to the conclusion, that there is not the least use, under such circumstances, for his existence; and you must admit that the decision is only logical and natural.

==== John Stuart Mill ====
John Stuart Mill (1806–1873), the English philosopher, also argued that utilitarianism must take animals into account, writing in 1864: "Nothing is more natural to human beings, nor, up to a certain point in cultivation, more universal, than to estimate the pleasures and pains of others as deserving of regard exactly in proportion to their likeness to ourselves. ... Granted that any practice causes more pain to animals than it gives pleasure to man; is that practice moral or immoral? And if, exactly in proportion as human beings raise their heads out of the slough of selfishness, they do not with one voice answer 'immoral,' let the morality of the principle of utility be for ever condemned."

==== Charles Darwin ====
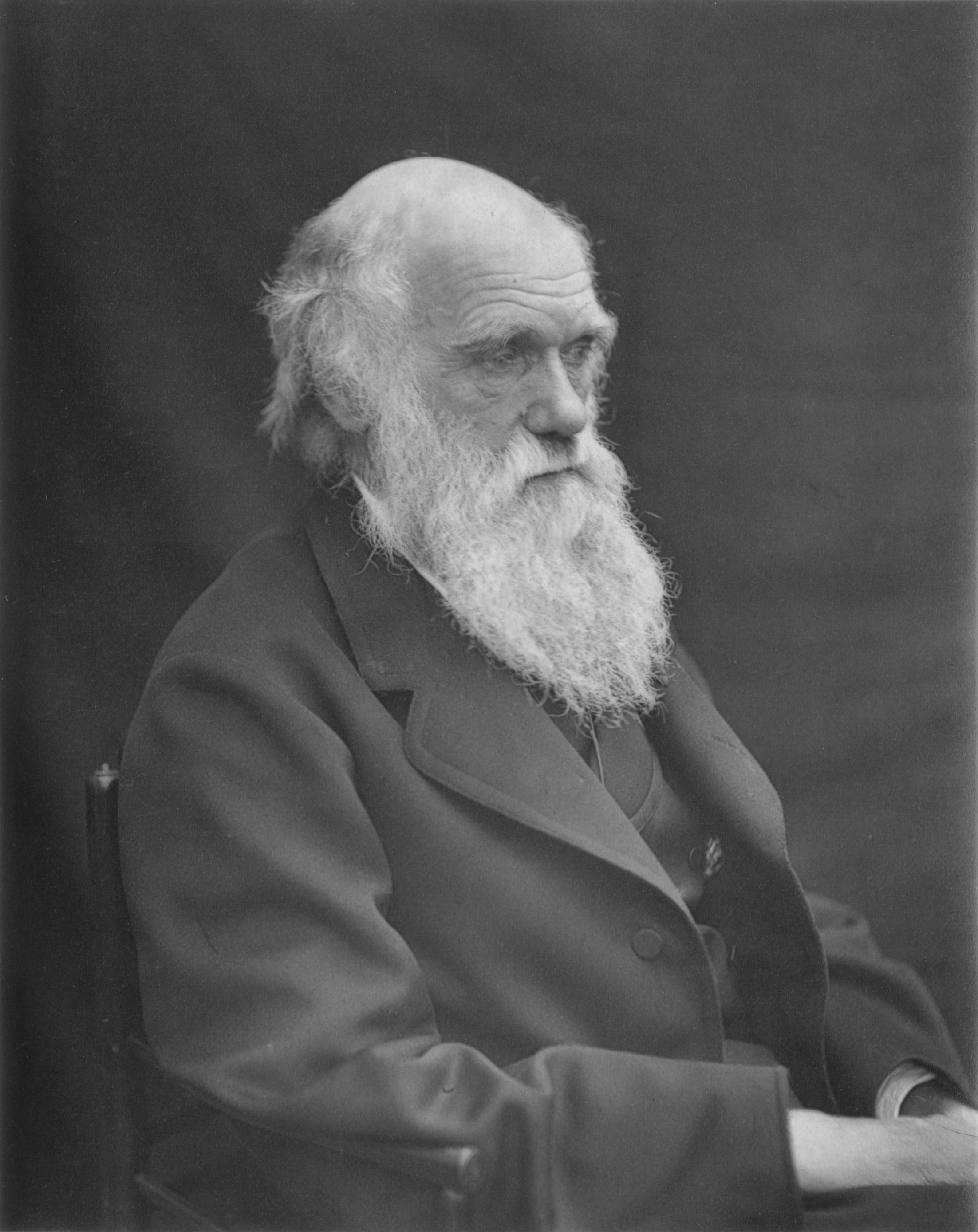
Charles Darwin wrote in 1837: "Do not slave holders wish to make the black man other kind?"

James Rachels writes that Charles Darwin's (1809–1882) On the Origin of Species (1859)—which presented the theory of evolution by natural selection—revolutionized the way humans viewed their relationship with other species. Not only did human beings have a direct kinship with other animals, but the latter had social, mental and moral lives too, Darwin argued. He wrote in his Notebooks (1837): "Animals – whom we have made our slaves we do not like to consider our equals. – Do not slave holders wish to make the black man other kind?" Later, in The Descent of Man (1871), he argued that "There is no fundamental difference between man and the higher mammals in their mental faculties", attributing to animals the power of reason, decision making, memory, sympathy, and imagination.

Rachels writes that Darwin noted the moral implications of the cognitive similarities, arguing that "humanity to the lower animals" was one of the "noblest virtues with which man is endowed." He was strongly opposed to any kind of cruelty to animals, including setting traps. He wrote in a letter that he supported vivisection for "real investigations on physiology; but not for mere damnable and detestable curiosity. It is a subject which makes me sick with horror ..." In 1875, he testified before a Royal Commission on Vivisection, lobbying for a bill to protect both the animals used in vivisection, and the study of physiology. Rachels writes that the animal rights advocates of the day, such as Frances Power Cobbe, did not see Darwin as an ally.

==== American SPCA, Frances Power Cobbe, Anna Kingsford ====
Frances Power Cobbe founded two of the first anti-vivisection groups.

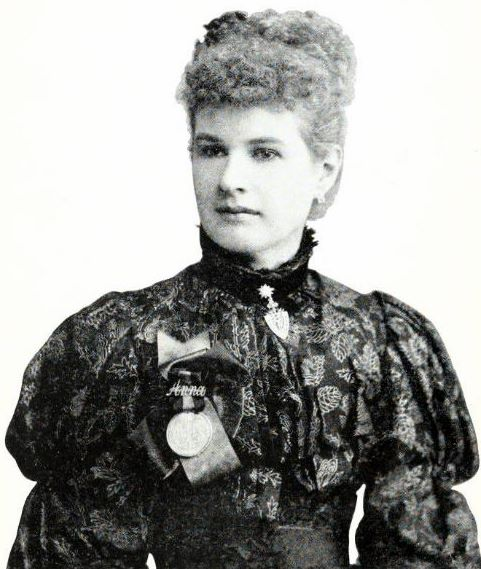
Anna Kingsford, one of the first English women to graduate in medicine, published The Perfect Way in Diet (1881), advocating vegetarianism.

An early proposal for legal rights for animals came from a group of citizens in Ashtabula County, Ohio. Around 1844, the group proposed an amendment to the U.S. Constitution stating that if slaves from slave states were receiving representation as 3/5 of a person on the basis that they were animal property, all the animal property of the free states should receive representation also.

The first animal protection group in the United States, the American Society for the Prevention of Cruelty to Animals (ASPCA), was founded by Henry Bergh in April 1866. Bergh had been appointed by President Abraham Lincoln to a diplomatic post in Russia, and had been disturbed by the mistreatment of animals he witnessed there. He consulted with the president of the RSPCA in London, and returned to the United States to speak out against bullfights, cockfights, and the beating of horses. He created a "Declaration of the Rights of Animals", and in 1866 persuaded the New York state legislature to pass anti-cruelty legislation and to grant the ASPCA the authority to enforce it.

In 1875, the Irish social reformer Frances Power Cobbe (1822–1904) founded the Society for the Protection of Animals Liable to Vivisection, the world's first organization opposed to animal research, which became the National Anti-Vivisection Society. In 1880, the English feminist Anna Kingsford (1846–1888) became one of the first English women to graduate in medicine, after studying for her degree in Paris, and the only student at the time to do so without having experimented on animals. She published The Perfect Way in Diet (1881), advocating vegetarianism, and in the same year founded the Food Reform Society. She was also vocal in her opposition to experimentation on animals. In 1898, Cobbe set up the British Union for the Abolition of Vivisection, with which she campaigned against the use of dogs in research, coming close to success with the 1919 Dogs (Protection) Bill, which almost became law.

Ryder writes that, as the interest in animal protection grew in the late 1890s, attitudes toward animals among scientists began to harden. They embraced the idea that what they saw as anthropomorphism—the attribution of human qualities to nonhumans—was unscientific. Animals had to be approached as physiological entities only, as Ivan Pavlov wrote in 1927, "without any need to resort to fantastic speculations as to the existence of any possible subjective states." It was a position that hearkened back to Descartes in the 17th century, that nonhumans were purely mechanical, with no rationality and perhaps even no consciousness.

==== Friedrich Nietzsche ====
Avoiding utilitarianism, Friedrich Nietzsche (1844–1900) found other reasons to defend animals. He wrote that "The sight of blind suffering is the spring of the deepest emotion." He once wrote: "For man is the cruelest animal. At tragedies, bull-fights, and crucifixions hath he hitherto been happiest on earth; and when he invented his hell, behold, that was his heaven on earth." Throughout his writings, he speaks of the human being as an animal.

==== Henry Salt ====
In 1894, Henry Salt (1851–1939), a former master at Eton, who had set up the Humanitarian League to lobby for a ban on hunting the year before, published Animals' Rights: Considered in Relation to Social Progress. He wrote that the object of the essay was to "set the principle of animals' rights on a consistent and intelligible footing." Concessions to the demands for jus animalium had been made grudgingly to date, he wrote, with an eye on the interests of animals qua property, rather than as rights bearers:

Even the leading advocates of animal rights seem to have shrunk from basing their claim on the only argument which can ultimately be held to be a really sufficient one—the assertion that animals, as well as men, though, of course, to a far less extent than men, are possessed of a distinctive individuality, and, therefore, are in justice entitled to live their lives with a due measure of that "restricted freedom" to which Herbert Spencer alludes.

He argued that there was no point in claiming rights for animals if those rights were subordinated to human desire, and took issue with the idea that the life of a human might have more moral worth. "[The] notion of the life of an animal having 'no moral purpose,' belongs to a class of ideas which cannot possibly be accepted by the advanced humanitarian thought of the present day—it is a purely arbitrary assumption, at variance with our best instincts, at variance with our best science, and absolutely fatal (if the subject be clearly thought out) to any full realization of animals' rights. If we are ever going to do justice to the lower races, we must get rid of the antiquated notion of a 'great gulf' fixed between them and mankind, and must recognize the common bond of humanity that unites all living beings in one universal brotherhood."

=== 20th century: Animal rights movement ===
==== Brown Dog Affair, Lizzy Lind af Hageby ====
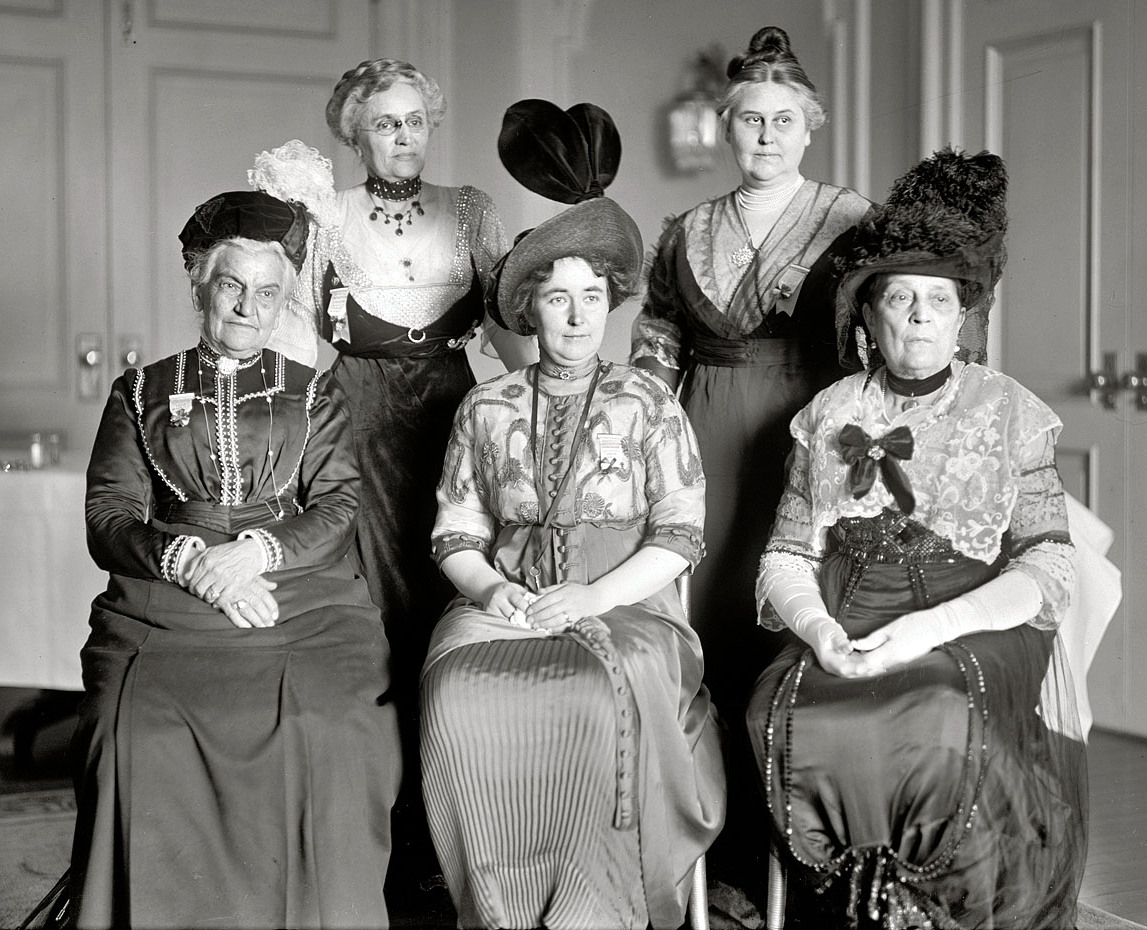
Lizzy Lind af Hageby (centre, seated) in 1913.

In 1902, Lizzy Lind af Hageby (1878–1963), a Swedish feminist, and a friend, Lisa Shartau, traveled to England to study medicine at the London School of Medicine for Women, intending to learn enough to become authoritative anti-vivisection campaigners. In the course of their studies, they witnessed several animal experiments, and published the details as The Shambles of Science: Extracts from the Diary of Two Students of Physiology (1903). Their allegations included that they had seen a brown terrier dog dissected while conscious, which prompted angry denials from the researcher, William Bayliss, and his colleagues. After Stephen Coleridge of the National Anti-Vivisection Society accused Bayliss of having violated the Cruelty to Animals Act 1876, Bayliss sued and won, convincing a court that the animal had been anesthetized as required by the Act.

In response, anti-vivisection campaigners commissioned a statue of the dog to be erected in Battersea Park in 1906, with the plaque: "Men and Women of England, how long shall these Things be?" The statue caused uproar among medical students, leading to frequent vandalism of the statue and the need for a 24-hour police guard. The affair culminated in riots in 1907 when 1,000 medical students clashed with police, suffragettes and trade unionists in Trafalgar Square. Battersea Council removed the statue from the park under cover of darkness two years later.

Coral Lansbury (1985) and Hilda Kean (1998) write that the significance of the affair lay in the relationships that formed in support of the "Brown Dog Done to Death", which became a symbol of the oppression the women's suffrage movement felt at the hands of the male political and medical establishment. Kean argues that both sides saw themselves as heirs to the future. The students saw the women and trade unionists as representatives of anti-science sentimentality, and the women saw themselves as progressive, with the students and their teachers belonging to a previous age.

==== Development of mainstream veganism ====
Members of the English Vegetarian Society who avoided the use of eggs and animal milk in the 19th and early 20th century were known as strict vegetarians. The International Vegetarian Union cites an article informing readers of alternatives to shoe leather in the Vegetarian Society's magazine in 1851 as evidence of the existence of a group that sought to avoid animal products entirely. There was increasing unease within the society from the start of the 20th century onwards with regards to egg and milk consumption, and in 1923 its magazine wrote that the "ideal position for vegetarians is [complete] abstinence from animal products."

Mahatma Gandhi (1869–1948) argued in 1931 before a meeting of the society in London that vegetarianism should be pursued in the interests of animals, and not only as a human health issue. He met both Henry Salt and Anna Kingsford, and read Salt's A Plea for Vegetarianism (1886). Salt wrote in the book that "a Vegetarian is still regarded, in ordinary society, as little better than a madman." In 1944, several members, led by Donald Watson (1910–2005), decided to break from the Vegetarian Society over the issue of egg and milk use. Watson coined the term "vegan" for those whose diet included no animal products, and they formed the British Vegan Society on November 1 that year.

==== Tierschutzgesetz ====
This cartoon appeared in Kladderadatsch, a German satirical magazine, on September 3, 1933, showing lab animals giving the Nazi salute to Hermann Göring, after restrictions on animal testing were announced.

On coming to power in January 1933, the Nazi Party passed a comprehensive set of animal protection laws. Arnold Arluke and Boria Sax wrote that the Nazis tried to abolish the distinction between humans and animals, to the point where many people were regarded as less valuable than animals. In April 1933 the Nazis passed laws regulating the slaughter of animals; one of their targets was kosher slaughter. In November the Tierschutzgesetz, or animal protection law, was introduced, with Adolf Hitler announcing an end to animal cruelty: "Im neuen Reich darf es keine Tierquälerei mehr geben." ("In the new Reich, no more animal cruelty will be allowed.") It was followed in July 1934 by the Reichsjagdgesetz, prohibiting hunting; in July 1935 by the Naturschutzgesetz, environmental legislation; in November 1937 by a law regulating animal transport in cars; and in September 1938 by a similar law dealing with animals on trains. Hitler was a vegetarian in the later years of his life; several members of his inner circle, including Rudolf Hess, Joseph Goebbels, and Heinrich Himmler, adopted some form of vegetarianism. By most accounts their vegetarianism was not as strict as Hitler's.

==== Increase in animal use ====
Despite the proliferation of animal protection legislation, animals still had no legal rights. Debbie Legge writes that existing legislation was very much tied to the idea of human interests, whether protecting human sensibilities by outlawing cruelty, or protecting property rights by making sure animals were not harmed. The over-exploitation of fishing stocks, for example, is viewed as harming the environment for people; the hunting of animals to extinction means that humans in the future will derive no enjoyment from them; poaching results in financial loss to the owner, and so on.

Notwithstanding the interest in animal welfare of the previous century, the situation for animals deteriorated in the 20th century, particularly after the Second World War. This was in part because of the increase in the numbers used in animal research—300 in the UK in 1875, 19,084 in 1903, and 2.8 million in 2005 (50–100 million worldwide), and a modern annual estimated range of 10 million to upwards of 100 million in the US—but mostly because of the industrialization of farming, which saw billions of animals raised and killed for food on a scale considered impossible before the war.

==== Development of direct action ====
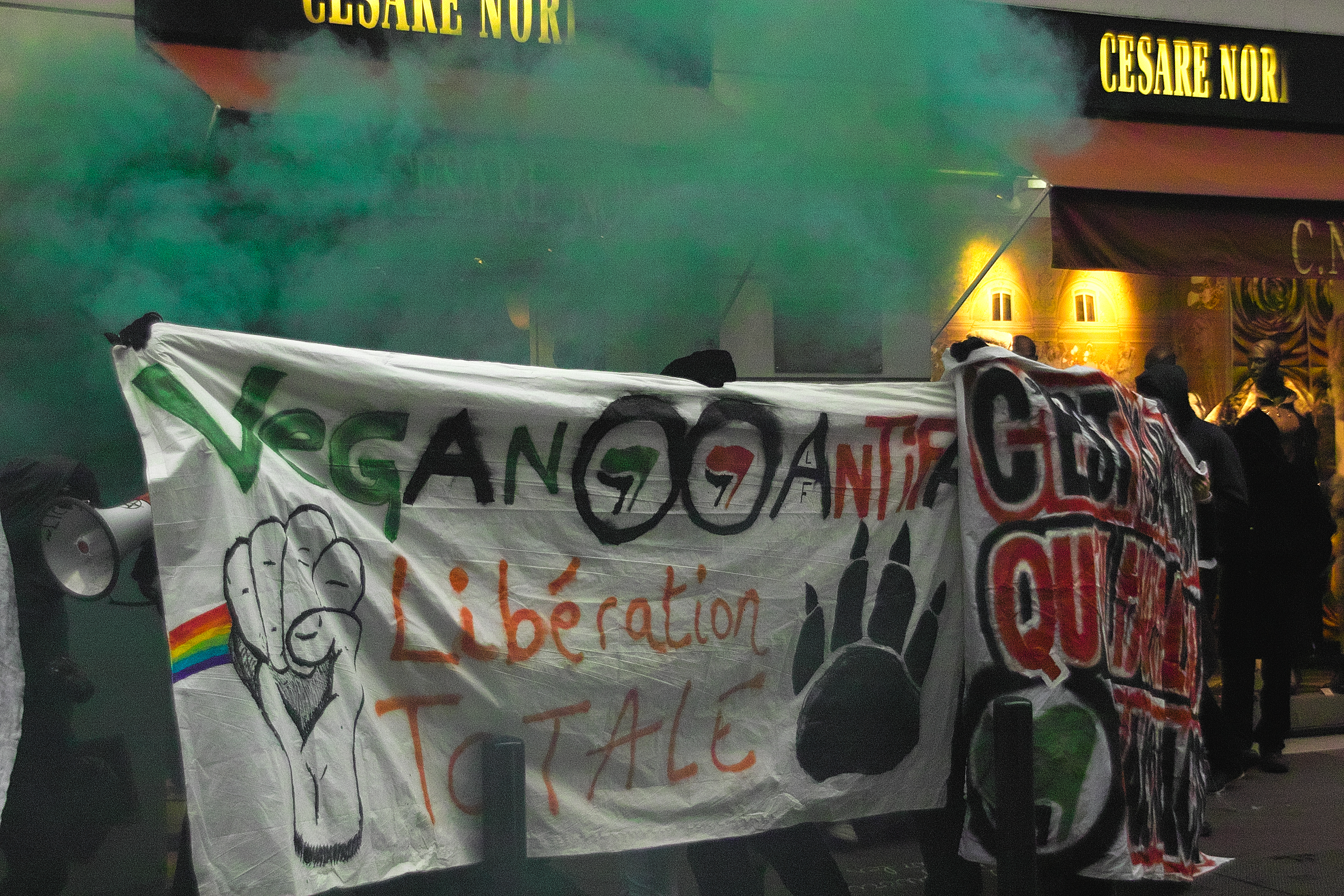
Anarchists and anti fascists protesting for animal liberation.

In the early 1960s in England, support for animal rights began to coalesce around the issue of blood sports, particularly hunting deer, foxes, and otters using dogs, an aristocratic and middle-class English practice, stoutly defended in the name of protecting rural traditions. The psychologist Richard D. Ryder – who became involved with the animal rights movement in the late 1960s – writes that the new chair of the League Against Cruel Sports tried in 1963 to steer it away from confronting members of the hunt, which triggered the formation that year of a direct action breakaway group, the Hunt Saboteurs Association. This was set up by a journalist, John Prestige, who had witnessed a pregnant deer being chased into a village and killed by the Devon and Somerset Staghounds. The practice of sabotaging hunts (for example, by misleading the dogs with scents or horns) spread throughout south-east England, particularly around university towns, leading to violent confrontations when the huntsmen attacked the "sabs".

The controversy spread to the RSPCA, which had grown away from its radical roots to become a conservative group with charity status and royal patronage. It had failed to speak out against hunting, and indeed counted huntsmen among its members. As with the League Against Cruel Sports, this position gave rise to a splinter group, the RSPCA Reform Group, which sought to radicalize the organization, leading to chaotic meetings of the group's ruling Council, and successful (though short-lived) efforts to change it from within by electing to the council members who would argue from an animal rights perspective, and force the RSPCA to address issues such as hunting, factory farming, and animal experimentation. Ryder himself was elected to the council in 1971, and served as its chair from 1977 to 1979.

==== Formation of the Oxford group ====
The same period saw writers and academics begin to speak out again in favor of animal rights. Ruth Harrison published Animal Machines (1964), an influential critique of factory farming, and on October 10, 1965, the novelist Brigid Brophy had an article, "The Rights of Animals", published in The Sunday Times. She wrote:

The relationship of Homo sapiens to the other animals is one of unremitting exploitation. We employ their work; we eat and wear them. We exploit them to serve our superstitions: whereas we used to sacrifice them to our gods and tear out their entrails in order to foresee the future, we now sacrifice them to science, and experiment on their entrails in the hope—or on the mere off chance—that we might thereby see a little more clearly into the present ... To us it seems incredible that the Greek philosophers should have scanned so deeply into right and wrong and yet never noticed the immorality of slavery. Perhaps 3000 years from now it will seem equally incredible that we do not notice the immorality of our own oppression of animals.

Robert Garner writes that Harrison's book and Brophy's article led to an explosion of interest in the relationship between humans and nonhumans. In particular, Brophy's article was discovered in or around 1969 by a group of postgraduate philosophy students at the University of Oxford, Roslind and Stanley Godlovitch (husband and wife from Canada), John Harris, and David Wood, now known as the Oxford Group. They decided to put together a symposium to discuss the theory of animal rights.

Around the same time, Richard Ryder wrote several letters to The Daily Telegraph criticizing animal experimentation, based on incidents he had witnessed in laboratories. The letters, published in April and May 1969, were seen by Brigid Brophy, who put Ryder in touch with the Godlovitches and Harris. Ryder also started distributing pamphlets in Oxford protesting against experiments on animals; it was in one of these pamphlets in 1970 that he coined the term "speciesism" to describe the exclusion of nonhuman animals from the protections offered to humans. He subsequently became a contributor to the Godlovitches' symposium, as did Harrison and Brophy, and it was published in 1971 as Animals, Men and Morals: An Inquiry into the Maltreatment of Non-humans.

==== Publication of Animal Liberation ====
In 1970, over lunch in Oxford with fellow student Richard Keshen, a vegetarian, Australian philosopher Peter Singer came to believe that, by eating animals, he was engaging in the oppression of other species. Keshen introduced Singer to the Godlovitches, and in 1973 Singer reviewed their book for The New York Review of Books. In the review, he used the term "animal liberation", writing:

We are familiar with Black Liberation, Gay Liberation, and a variety of other movements. With Women's Liberation some thought we had come to the end of the road. Discrimination on the basis of sex, it has been said, is the last form of discrimination that is universally accepted and practiced without pretense ... But one should always be wary of talking of "the last remaining form of discrimination." ... Animals, Men and Morals is a manifesto for an Animal Liberation movement.

On the strength of his review, The New York Review of Books took the unusual step of commissioning a book from Singer on the subject, published in 1975 as Animal Liberation, now one of the animal rights movement's canonical texts. Singer based his arguments on the principle of utilitarianism – the view, in its simplest form, that an act is right if it leads to the "greatest happiness of the greatest number", a phrase first used in 1776 by Jeremy Bentham. He argued in favor of the equal consideration of interests, the position that there are no grounds to suppose that a violation of the basic interests of a human—for example, an interest in not suffering—is different in any morally significant way from a violation of the basic interests of a nonhuman. Singer used the term "speciesism" in the book, citing Ryder, and it stuck, becoming an entry in the Oxford English Dictionary in 1989.

The book's publication triggered a groundswell of scholarly interest in animal rights. Richard Ryder's Victims of Science: The Use of Animals in Research (1975) appeared, followed by Andrew Linzey's Animal Rights: A Christian Perspective (1976), and Stephen R. L. Clark's The Moral Status of Animals (1977). A Conference on Animal Rights was organized by Ryder and Linzey at Trinity College, Cambridge, in August 1977. This was followed by Mary Midgley's Beast And Man: The Roots of Human Nature (1978), then Animal Rights–A Symposium (1979), which included the papers delivered to the Cambridge conference.

From 1982 onwards, a series of articles by Tom Regan led to his The Case for Animal Rights (1983), in which he argues that nonhuman animals are "subjects-of-a-life", and therefore possessors of moral rights, a work regarded as a key text in animal rights theory. Regan wrote in 2001 that philosophers had written more about animal rights in the previous 20 years than in the 2,000 years before that. Garner writes that Charles Magel's bibliography, Keyguide to Information Sources in Animal Rights (1989), contains 10 pages of philosophical material on animals up to 1970, but 13 pages between 1970 and 1989 alone.

==== Founding of the Animal Liberation Front ====
In 1971, a law student, Ronnie Lee, formed a branch of the Hunt Saboteurs Association in Luton, later calling it the Band of Mercy after a 19th-century RSPCA youth group. The Band attacked hunters' vehicles by slashing tires and breaking windows, calling it "active compassion". In November 1973, they engaged in their first act of arson when they set fire to a Hoechst Pharmaceuticals research laboratory, claiming responsibility as a "nonviolent guerilla organization dedicated to the liberation of animals from all forms of cruelty and persecution at the hands of mankind."

Lee and another activist were sentenced to three years in prison in 1974, paroled after 12 months. In 1976, Lee brought together the remaining Band of Mercy activists along with some fresh faces to start a leaderless resistance movement, calling it the Animal Liberation Front (ALF). ALF activists see themselves as a modern Underground Railroad, passing animals removed from farms and laboratories to sympathetic veterinarians, safe houses and sanctuaries. Some activists also engage in threats, intimidation, and arson, acts that have lost the movement sympathy in mainstream public opinion.

The decentralized model of activism is frustrating for law enforcement organizations, who find the networks difficult to infiltrate, because they tend to be organized around friends. In 2005, the US Department of Homeland Security indicated how seriously it takes the ALF when it included them in a list of domestic terrorist threats. The tactics of some of the more determined ALF activists are anathema to many animal rights advocates, such as Singer, who regard the movement as something that should occupy the moral high ground. ALF activists respond to the criticism with the argument that, as Ingrid Newkirk puts it, "Thinkers may prepare revolutions, but bandits must carry them out."

From the 1980s through to the early 2000s there was an increased level of violence by animal rights extremist groups directed at individuals and institutions associated with animal research. Activist groups involved included the Justice Department, the Animal Rights Militia and SHAC.

==== Subcultures and animal rights ====
In the 1980s, animal rights became associated with punk subculture and ideologies, particularly straight edge hardcore punk in the United States and anarcho-punk in the United Kingdom. This association continues on into the 21st century, as evidenced by the prominence of vegan punk events such as Fluff Fest in Europe.

==== Animal Rights International ====
Henry Spira (1927–1998), a former seaman and civil rights activist, became the most notable of the new animal advocates in the United States. A proponent of gradual change, he formed Animal Rights International in 1974, and introduced the idea of "reintegrative shaming", whereby a relationship is formed between a group of animal rights advocates and a corporation they see as misusing animals, with a view to obtaining concessions or halting a practice. It is a strategy that has been widely adopted, including the group People for the Ethical Treatment of Animals.

Spira's first campaign was in opposition to the American Museum of Natural History in 1976, where cats were being experimented on, research that he persuaded them to stop. In 1980 he convinced the cosmetics company Revlon to stop using the Draize test, which involves toxicity tests on the skin or in the eyes of animals. He took out a full-page ad in several newspapers, featuring a rabbit with sticking plaster over the eyes, and the caption, "How many rabbits does Revlon blind for beauty's sake?" Revlon stopped using animals for cosmetics testing, donated money to help set up the Center for Alternatives to Animal Testing, and was followed by other leading cosmetics companies.

=== 21st century: developments ===
In 1999, New Zealand passed a new Animal Welfare Act that had the effect of banning experiments on "non-human hominids".

Also in 1999, Public Law 106-152 (Title 18, Section 48) was put into action in the United States. This law makes it a felony to create, sell, or possess videos showing animal cruelty with the intention of profiting financially from them. However, there have been strong arguments that this law is unconstitutional in light of the Supreme Court's jurisprudence concerning privacy and sex. as well as the fact that the U.S. government may not criminalize mere possession of obscene materials in the privacy of one's own home.

In 2005, the Austrian Parliament banned experiments on apes, unless they are performed in the interests of the individual ape. Also in Austria, the Supreme Court ruled in January 2008 that a chimpanzee (called Matthew Hiasl Pan by those advocating for his personhood) was not a person, after the Association Against Animal Factories sought personhood status for him because his custodians had gone bankrupt. The chimpanzee had been captured as a baby in Sierra Leone in 1982, then smuggled to Austria to be used in pharmaceutical experiments, but was discovered by customs officials when he arrived in the country, and was taken to a shelter instead. He was kept there for 25 years, until the group that ran the shelter went bankrupt in 2007. Donors offered to help him, but under Austrian law only a person can receive personal gifts, so any money sent to support him would be lost to the shelter's bankruptcy. The association appealed the ruling to the European Court of Human Rights. The lawyer proposing the chimpanzee's personhood asked the court to appoint a legal guardian for him and to grant him four rights: the right to life, limited freedom of movement, personal safety, and the right to claim property.

In June 2008, a committee of Spain's national legislature became the first to vote for a resolution to extend limited rights to nonhuman primates. The parliamentary Environment Committee recommended giving chimpanzees, gorillas and orangutans the right not to be used in medical experiments or in circuses, and recommended making it illegal to kill apes, except in self-defense, based upon the rights recommended by the Great Ape Project. The committee's proposal has not yet been enacted into law.

From 2009 onwards, several countries outlawed the use of some or all animals in circuses, starting with Bolivia, and followed by several countries in Europe, Scandinavia, the Middle East, and Singapore.

In 2010, the regional government in Catalonia passed a motion to outlaw bull fighting, the first such ban in Spain. In 2011, PETA sued SeaWorld over the captivity of five orcas in San Diego and Orlando, arguing that the whales were being treated as slaves. It was the first time the Thirteenth Amendment to the United States Constitution, which outlaws slavery and involuntary servitude, was cited in court to protect nonhuman rights. A federal judge dismissed the case in February 2012.

==== Petitions for habeas corpus ====
In 2015, the Nonhuman Rights Project (NhPR) filed three lawsuits in New York State on behalf of four captive chimpanzees, demanding that the courts grant them the right to bodily liberty via the writ of habeas corpus and immediately send them to a sanctuary affiliated with the North American Primate Sanctuary Alliance. All of the petitions were denied. In the case involving the chimpanzees Hercules and Leo, Justice Barbara Jaffe did not immediately dismiss the filing and instead ordered a hearing requiring the chimpanzee owner to show why the chimpanzees should not be released and transferred to the sanctuary. Following the hearing, Justice Jaffe issued an order denying Hercules and Leo's petition.

Even though the petition was denied, the NhRP interpreted Justice Jaffe's decision as a victory. In its press release it emphasized the fact that Justice Jaffe agreed with NhRP, writing that "'persons' are not restricted to human beings, and that who is a 'person' is not a question of biology, but of public policy and principle" and also stating that "efforts to extend legal rights to chimpanzees are thus understandable; some day they may even succeed."

== Bibliography ==
Books and papers are cited in short form in the footnotes, with full citations here. News and other sources are cited in full in the footnotes.

- Bentham, Jeremy (1781). Principles of Penal Law. ISBN 1379912326
- Beauchamp, Tom (2009). "The Moral Standing of Animals", in Marc Bekoff. Encyclopedia of Animal Rights and Animal Welfare. Greenwood. ISBN 0313352593
- Beauchamp, Tom (2011a). "Introduction," in Tom Beauchamp and R.G. Frey (eds.). The Oxford Handbook of Animal Ethics. Oxford University Press. ISBN 019935197X
- Beauchamp, Tom (2011b). "Rights Theory and Animal Rights," in Beauchamp and Frey, op cit. ISBN 019935197X
- Clark, Stephen R. L. (1977). The Moral Status of Animals. Oxford University Press. ISBN 0192830406
- Godlovitch, Roslind; Godlovitch Stanley; and Harris John (1971). Animals, Men and Morals: An Inquiry into the Maltreatment of Non-humans. Victor Gollancz.
- Kant, Immanuel (1785). Groundwork of the Metaphysic of Morals.
- Kean, Hilda (1998). Animal Rights: Political and Social Change in Britain since 1800. Reaktion Books.
- Kean, Hilda (1995). "The 'Smooth Cool Men of Science': The Feminist and Socialist Response to Vivisection", History Workshop Journal, No. 40 (Autumn), pp. 16–38.
- Kelch, Thomas G. (2011). Globalization and Animal Law. Kluwer Law International.
- Kete, Kathleen (2002). "Animals and Ideology: The Politics of Animal Protection in Europe," in Nigel Rothfels (ed.). Representing Animals. Indiana University Press.
- Lansbury, Coral (1985). The Old Brown Dog: Women, Workers, and Vivisection in Edwardian England. University of Wisconsin Press.
- Legge, Debbi and Brooman, Simon (1997). Law Relating to Animals. Cavendish Publishing. ISBN 1859412386
- Leneman, Leah (1999). "No Animal Food: The Road to Veganism in Britain, 1909–1944," Society and Animals, 7, 1–5.
- Locke, John (1693). Some Thoughts Concerning Education.
- Mason, Peter (1997). The Brown Dog Affair. Two Sevens Publishing.
- Midgley, Mary (1984). Animals and Why They Matter. University of Georgia Press. ISBN 0820320412
- Molland, Neil (2004). "Thirty Years of Direct Action" in Best and Nocella, op cit.
- Monaghan, Rachael (2000). "Terrorism in the Name of Animal Rights," in Taylor, Maxwell and Horgan, John. The Future of Terrorism. Routledge.
- Murray, L. (2006). "The ASPCA–Pioneers in Animal Welfare", Encyclopædia Britannica's Advocacy for Animals.
- Najafi, Sina and Kete, Kathleen (2001). "Beastly Agendas: An Interview with Kathleen Kete", Cabinet, issue 4, Fall.
- Nash, Roderick (1989). The Rights of Nature: A History of Environmental Ethics. University of Wisconsin Press.
- Newkirk, Ingrid (2004). "The ALF: Who, Why, and What?", in Steven Best and Anthony Nocella. (eds).Terrorists or Freedom Fighters? Reflections on the Liberation of Animals. Lantern 2004.
- Phelps, Norm (2007). The Longest Struggle: Animal Advocacy from Pythagoras to PETA. Lantern Books.
- Proctor, Robert N. (1999). The Nazi War on Cancer. Princeton University Press.
- Rachels, James (2009). "Darwin, Charles," in Bekoff, op cit.
- Redclift, Michael R. (2010). The International Handbook of Environmental Sociology. Edward Elgar Publishing.
- Regan, Tom (1983). The Case for Animal Rights. University of California Press.
- Regan, Tom (2001). Defending Animal Rights. University of Illinois Press.
- Rousseau, Jean-Jacques (1754). Discourse on Inequality.
- Rudacille, Deborah (2000). The Scalpel and the Butterfly. University of California Press.
- Ryder, Richard (2000) [1989]. Animal Revolution: Changing Attitudes Towards Speciesism. Berg.
- Salt, Henry Stephens (1880). A Plea for Vegetarianism and other essays.
- Salt, Henry Stephens (1894). Animals' Rights: Considered in Relation to Social Progress, Macmillan & Co.
- Salt, Henry Stephens (1899). The logic of vegetarianism
- Sax, Boria (2000). Animals in the Third Reich: Pets, Scapegoats, and the Holocaust. Continuum International Publishing Group.
- Singer, Peter (April 5, 1973). "Animal liberation", The New York Review of Books, Volume 20, Number 5.
- Singer, Peter (1990) [1975]. Animal Liberation. New York Review Books.
- Singer, Peter (2000) [1998]. Ethics into Action: Henry Spira and the Animal Rights Movement. Rowman and Littlefield Publishers, Inc.
- Singer, Peter (2003). "Animal liberation at 30", The New York Review of Books, vol 50, no. 8, May 15.
- Singer, Peter (2004). "Ethics Beyond Species and Beyond Instincts," in Sunstein and Nussbaum, op cit.
- Singer, Peter (2011) [1979]. Practical Ethics. Cambridge University Press.
- Sorabji, Richard (1993). Animal Minds and Human Morals. University of Cornell Press.
- Steiner, Gary (2005). Anthropocentrism and its Discontents: The Moral Status of Animals in the History of Western Philosophy. University of Pittsburgh Press.
- Taylor, Angus (2009). Animals and Ethics: An Overview of the Philosophical Debate. Broadview Press.
- Taylor, Thomas (1792). "A Vindication of the Rights of Brutes," in Craciun, Adriana (2002). A Routledge Literary Sourcebook on Mary Wollstonecraft's A Vindication of the Rights of Woman. Routledge.
- Uekoetter, Frank (2006). The Green and the Brown: A History of Conservation in Nazi Germany. Cambridge University Press.
- Vyvyan, John. (1969). In Pity and in Anger. M. Joseph.
- Waldau, Paul (2001). The Specter of Speciesism: Buddhist and Christian Views of Animals. Oxford University Press.
- Waldau, Paul (2011). Animal Rights: What Everyone Needs to Know. Oxford University Press.
- Ward, Nathaniel (1896). The Earliest New England Code of Laws, 1641. A. Lovell & Company.
- Williams, Erin E. and DeMello, Margo (2007). Why Animals Matter. Prometheus Books.
- Wise, Steven M. (2007). "Animal Rights", Encyclopædia Britannica.
