= Oxford Group (animal rights) =

Group of intellectuals

The Oxford Group or Oxford Vegetarians consisted of a group of intellectuals in England in the late 1960s and early 1970s associated with the University of Oxford, who met and corresponded to discuss the emerging concept of animal rights, or animal liberation.

== History ==
The Oxford Group initially consisted of postgraduate philosophy students, and included Stanley and Roslind Godlovitch, John Harris, David Wood, and Michael Peters (a sociology postgrad). Its members were active in academic circles in Oxford, and through their influence others became interested in the idea of developing a moral philosophy that included non-humans. A particular inspiration was the writing of Brigid Brophy, the novelist. Brophy had written a piece on Animal Rights which was reprinted in the Sunday Times. This impressed group members because of its non-sentimental tone.The idea of editing a collection of essays on animal rights in a similar vein emerged, and Brophy and others agreed to contribute. The first publisher approached (at Ms Brophy's suggestion) was Michael Joseph where an editor suggested that such a book would be more interesting if group members contributed, as well as better known authors. This idea appealed but Michael Joseph were still not interested, so Stan Godlovitch and John Harris (also at Brophy's suggestion)then approached Victor Gollancz, where they met Giles Gordon. Gollancz were keen to go ahead, and the book was published a few months later as Animals, Men and Morals in 1971. The publication caused little excitement, with few reviews being written. John Harris was interviewed on the BBC PM program by William Hardcastle, and also appeared (alongside a factory farmer !) on BBC North's local news programme. It was not until Peter Singer's review in New York Review of Books, and his subsequent (and later best-selling) book Animal Liberation that interest began to grow. Animals, Men and Morals was eventually published in the U.S., in hardback and paperback. (For a detailed historical account of the group's members and activities, see Garner, R., and Okuleye, Y., in further reading, below.)

The period was a fertile one for the development of the concept of animal rights, both at the academic and activist level. Members of the Oxford Group contributed to a series of scholarly works that examined the moral assumptions underpinning the use of non-human animals, and helped to formulate a counter-position. The group engaged in political activism too, writing and handing out leaflets protesting against animal testing and hunting. Two of its members, Richard D. Ryder and Andrew Linzey, organized the Cambridge Conference on Animal Rights at Trinity College, Cambridge in 1977, the first international conference devoted explicitly to animal rights.

== Cambridge Conference on Animal Rights ==
The conference proceedings were published as Animals' Rights: A Symposium (1979). It produced a declaration – an appeal for animal rights and an end to speciesism – signed by 150 attendees:

We do not accept that a difference in species alone (any more than a difference in race) can justify wanton exploitation or oppression in the name of science or sport, or for food, commercial profit or other human gain.

We believe in the evolutionary and moral kinship of all animals and we declare our belief that all sentient creatures have rights to life, liberty, and the quest for happiness.

We call for the protection of these rights.

Conclusion

It is fair to say that over the years Animals, Men and Morals, and the later, and far more successful book, Peter Singer's Animal Liberation, sparked a huge revolution in the way animals are perceived. Countless books on the subject have appeared since, and popular culture has changed dramatically, for example in the rise of veganism, and the ubiquitous appearance of vegetarian and vegan products.

== People associated with the group ==
- Roslind and Stanley Godlovitch, husband and wife from Montreal, at the time postgraduate students in philosophy at St Hilda's College and New College, Oxford respectively, co-editors of an influential collection of essays, Animals, Men and Morals (1971)
- John Harris, postgraduate student in philosophy at Balliol College, co-editor of Animals, Men and Morals.
- Ruth Harrison, author of Animal Machines (1964), a criticism of factory farming
- Andrew Linzey, the Oxford theologian, author of Animal Rights: A Christian Assessment (1976), and founder in 2006 of the Oxford Centre for Animal Ethics
- Brigid Brophy, the novelist, author of an essay, "The Rights of Animals" (1965), which was published in The Sunday Times
- Stephen R. L. Clark, philosopher, studied at Balliol College, Oxford (1964–1968), fellow of All Souls (1968–1975), author of The Moral Status of Animals (1976)
- Patrick Corbett, philosopher, at the time a fellow at Balliol College
- Colin McGinn, philosopher, postgraduate student at Jesus College, Oxford (1972–1974)
- Mary Midgley, philosopher, author of Beast and Man (1978) and Animals And Why They Matter: A Journey Around the Species Barrier (1983)
- Michael Peters, sociologist, formerly of Hertford College, Oxford
- Tom Regan, the American philosopher and author of The Case for Animal Rights (1983), came into contact with the group when he visited Oxford in 1973.
- Richard Ryder, former animal researcher and senior clinical psychologist at the Warneford Hospital, Oxford, author of a 1970 leaflet on speciesism that coined the term, and later of Victims of Science: The Use of Animals in Research (1975) and Animal Revolution: Changing Attitudes Towards Speciesism (1989); former chairman of the RSPCA.
- Peter Singer, the Australian philosopher, was a postgraduate student at University College, Oxford (1969–1973); he was not himself a member of the Oxford Group at the time, but came to know them. He is the author of Animal Liberation (1975)
- David Wood, philosopher, postgraduate student at New College, Oxford (1968–1971)
- Jon Wynne-Tyson, publisher, author of Food For a Future: The Complete Case For Vegetarianism (1979)

== See also ==
- List of animal rights advocates
- List of animal rights groups
