= All Animals Are Equal =

All Animals Are Equal may refer to:

- "All animals are equal, but some animals are more equal than others", a line from George Orwell's Animal Farm
- "All Animals Are Equal", a widely anthologized essay by Peter Singer, first published in 1974 in the journal Philosophical Exchange
  - "All Animals Are Equal", a version of the essay published as the first chapter of Singer's Animal Liberation in 1975
- All Animals Are Equal (Gamma World), a 1993 adventure supplement authored by Dale "Slade" Henson for the fourth edition of the role-playing game Gamma World
