= Richard D. Ryder =

English animal rights advocate (born 1940)

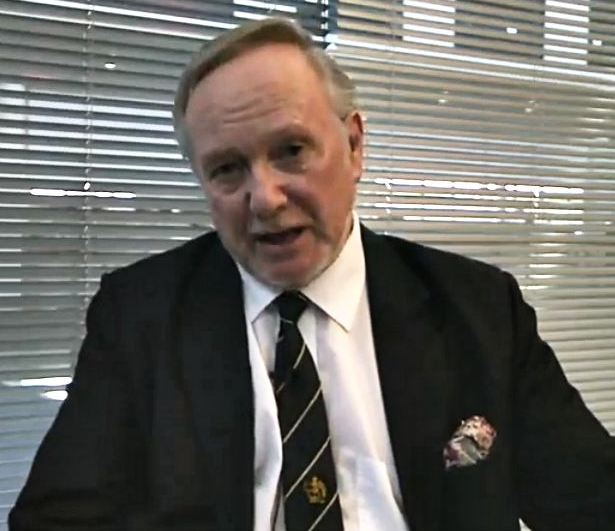
- Ryder in 2012
- Born: Richard Hood Jack Dudley Ryder; 3 July 1940 (age 86); London, Marylebone, England
- Education: University of Cambridge (MA in experimental psychology, 1963; PhD in social and political sciences, 1993); University of Edinburgh (Diploma in clinical psychology)
- Occupations: Writer; psychologist; animal rights advocate
- Known for: Advocacy of animal rights, opposition to animal research, coining of the terms speciesism and painism
- Spouse: Audrey Jane Smith (m. 1974; div. 1999)
- Children: 2
- Relatives: Granville Ryder (great-grandfather)
- Website: www.richardryder.com

Richard Hood Jack Dudley Ryder (born 3 July 1940) is an English writer, psychologist, and animal rights advocate. Ryder became known in the 1970s as a member of the Oxford Group, a group of intellectuals loosely centred on the University of Oxford who began to speak out against animal use, in particular factory farming and animal research. He was working at the time as a clinical psychologist at the Warneford Hospital in Oxford, and had himself been involved in animal research in the United Kingdom and United States.

In 1970, Ryder coined the term speciesism to describe the exclusion of nonhuman animals from the protections available to human beings. In 1977, he became chairman of the RSPCA Council, serving until 1979, and helped to organize the first academic animal-rights conference, held in August 1977 at Trinity College, Cambridge. The conference produced a "Declaration Against Speciesism", signed by 150 people.

Ryder assisted in achieving the legislative animal protection reforms in the UK and EU between 1970 and 2020. He is the author of a number of books about animal research, animal rights, and morality in politics, including Victims of Science (1975), Animal Revolution (1989), and Painism: A Modern Morality (2001). Ryder was president of the RSPCA from 2020–2023.

== Background ==
Richard Hood Jack Dudley Ryder was born at The London Clinic, Marylebone, on 3 July 1940, to Major Douglas Claud "Jack" Dudley Ryder, and his second wife, Vera Hamilton-Fletcher (née Cook). Jack Dudley Ryder was the great-grandson of the Honourable Granville Ryder (1799–1879), second son of Dudley Ryder, 1st Earl of Harrowby (1762–1847). Ryder was raised on the family estate, Rempstone Hall, in Corfe Castle.

Ryder was educated at Sherborne School, in Dorset, England. From 1960 to 1963 he studied the natural sciences tripos at Pembroke College, Cambridge, gaining a bachelor's degree in experimental psychology from the University of Cambridge, and then conducted research into animal behaviour at Columbia University followed by a diploma in clinical psychology from the University of Edinburgh. After Edinburgh, he worked as a clinical psychologist at the Warneford psychiatric hospital in Oxford. In 1983 and 1987 he ran unsuccessfully for Parliament, and founded the Liberal Democrats' Animal Protection Group. He later went back to Cambridge, and was awarded his PhD in Social and Political Sciences in 1993. He held an Andrew W. Mellon visiting professorship at Tulane University in New Orleans in 1996. He is President of the Animal Interfaith Alliance.

Ryder married Audrey Jane Smith in 1974; they had two children together and divorced in 1999.

== Animal rights advocacy ==
=== Oxford Group ===
Ryder first became involved with animal rights in 1969, when he protested against an otter hunt in Dorset. He was working at the time in the Warneford psychiatric hospital, and in April and May that year had three letters to the editor published in The Daily Telegraph, the first one headed "Rights of Non Human Animals," in which he criticised experiments on animals based on his own experiences in universities as an animal researcher. There was an increase in interest in animal rights during this period, following the publication of Ruth Harrison's Animal Machines (1964), a critique of factory farming, and a long article, "The Rights of Animals" (10 October 1965), by the novelist Brigid Brophy in The Sunday Times.

Brophy saw Ryder's letters in the Telegraph, and put him in touch with three philosophy postgraduate students at Oxford—Roslind Godlovitch, Stanley Godlovitch, and John Harris—who were editing a collection of essays about animal rights, published as Animals, Men and Morals: An Inquiry into the Maltreatment of Non-humans (1971). Ryder became involved with the group—which he later called the "Oxford Group"—and became an activist for animal rights, organising meetings and printing and handing out leaflets. He also became a contributor to the Godlovitches/Harris book. He was interviewed several times on the radio, and in December 1970 took part in a televised debate in Scotland on animal rights with Brophy.

=== Speciesism ===
Ryder first used the term speciesism in a privately printed leaflet by the same name, which he distributed in Oxford in 1970 in protest against animal experimentation; he wrote that he thought of the word while lying in the bath in the Old Manor House in Sunningwell, Oxfordshire. Paul Waldau writes that Ryder used the term in the pamphlet to address experiments on animals that he regarded as illogical, and which, he argued, a fully informed moral agent would challenge. Ryder was also addressing the general attitude that excluded all nonhumans from the protections offered to humans, now known as the anti-speciesism critique. Waldau writes that this original definition of the term – in effect, human-speciesism – has been extended by others to refer to the assignment of value to any being on the basis of species membership alone, so that, for example, prioritising the value of chimpanzees over other animals (human-chimpanzee speciesism) might be seen as similarly illogical.

Ryder used the term again in his contribution to the Godlovitches/Harris book, in an essay called "Experiments on Animals" (1971). He wrote in the essay that animal researchers seek to have it both ways: they defend the scientific validity of animal experiments on the grounds of the similarity between humans and nonhumans, while defending the morality of it on the grounds of the differences. He argued that speciesism is as illogical as racism, writing that "species" and "race" are both vague terms, and asked: "If, under special conditions, it were one day found possible to cross a professor of biology with an ape, would the offspring be kept in a cage or in a cradle?"

The book was reviewed by Peter Singer in 1973 in The New York Review of Books, in which he argued that it was a call for the foundation of an animal liberation movement. The article led the New York Review to commission a book from Singer, published as Animal Liberation (1975). Singer used the term speciesism in the book, attributing it to Ryder, and included it the title of his fifth chapter – "Man's Dominion ... a short history of speciesism". Writing that it was not an attractive word, he defined it as "a prejudice or attitude of bias in favour of the interests of members of one's own species and against those of members of other species", and argued that it was a prejudice similar to racism and sexism. Singer wrote:

Racists violate the principle of equality by giving greater weight to the interests of members of their own race when there is a clash between their interests and the interests of those of another race. Sexists violate the principle of equality by favouring the interests of their own sex. Similarly, speciesists allows the interests of their own species to override the greater interests of members of other species. The pattern is identical in each case.

Singer's use of the term popularised it, and in 1985 became an entry in the Oxford English Dictionary, described as "discrimination against ... animal species by human beings, based on an assumption of mankind's superiority".

=== RSPCA Reform Group ===
The RSPCA Reform Group was founded in 1970 by members of the British RSPCA. Their aim was to change the direction of the RSPCA from an organisation that dealt mostly with companion animals into one that would oppose what the reformers saw as the key issues: factory farming, animal research, hunting, and bloodsports. They sought to secure the election of reformers – including Ryder and Andrew Linzey, the Oxford theologian – to the RSPCA's ruling council. As a result, Ryder was elected to the council in 1971, became its vice-chairman in 1976, then chairman from 1977 to 1979.

=== Painism ===
Ryder coined the term painism in 1990 to describe his position that all beings who feel pain deserve rights. He argues that painism can be seen as a third way between Peter Singer's utilitarian position and Tom Regan's deontological rights view. It combines the utilitarian view that moral status comes from the ability to feel pain with the rights-view prohibition on using others as a means to an end. He has criticised Regan's criterion for inherent worth, arguing that all beings who feel pain have inherent value. He has also criticised the utilitarian idea that exploitation of others can be justified if there is an overall gain in pleasure. He wrote in The Guardian in 2005: "One of the problems with the utilitarian view is that, for example, the sufferings of a gang-rape victim can be justified if the rape gives a greater sum total of pleasure to the rapists." Ryder argues that this is a problem because "consciousness ... is bounded by the boundaries of the individual. My pain and the pain of others are thus in separate categories; you cannot add or subtract them from each other. ... In any situation we should ... concern ourselves primarily with the pain of the individual who is the maximum sufferer."

Ryder was featured in the 2012 speciesism movie, The Superior Human?, in which he describes his coining of the word speciesism and the principle of painism.

=== Oxford animal laboratory ===
Ryder is a supporter of VERO (Voice for Ethical Research at Oxford), a group of Oxford members and graduates formed in 2006 to protest the construction by the university of a new animal laboratory, the Biomedical Sciences Building, completed in 2008.

== Selected publications ==
- (1970). Speciesism, privately printed leaflet, Oxford.
- (1971). "Experiments on Animals," in Stanley and Roslind Godlovitch and John Harris. Animals, Men and Morals. Grove Press, Inc.
- (1974). Speciesism: The Ethics of Vivisection. Scottish Society for the Prevention of Vivisection.
- (1975). Victims of Science: The Use of Animals in Research. Davis-Poynter Ltd.
- with W. Lane-Petter et al (September 1976). "The Ethics of Animal Experimentation", Journal of Medical Ethics. Vol. 2, No. 3, pp. 118–126.
- with David Paterson (eds.) (1979). Animals' Rights – A Symposium. Centaur Press Ltd.
- (1989). Animal Revolution: Changing Attitudes Towards Speciesism. McFarland & Co Inc.
- (1991). "Animal Experimentation: Sentientism," The Psychologist, vol 4, 1991.
- (ed.) (1992). Animal Welfare and the Environment. Gerald Duckworth & Co Ltd, in association with the RSPCA
- (1992). "Painism: Ethics, Animal Rights and Environmentalism," UWCC Centre for Applied Ethics.
- (ed.) (1992). The Duty of Mercy by Humphrey Primatt (first published 1776). Open Gate Press.
- (1998). The Political Animal: The Conquest of Speciesism. McFarland & Co Inc.
- (2001). Painism: A Modern Morality. Open Gate Press.
- (2005). The Calcrafts of Rempstone Hall: The Intriguing History of a Dorset Dynasty. Halsgrove.
- (2006). Putting Morality Back into Politics. Imprint Academic.
- (2009). Nelson, Hitler and Diana: Studies in Trauma and Celebrity. Imprint Academic.
- (2009). "Painism versus Utilitarianism", Think, vol 8, pp 85–89.
- (2011). Speciesism, Painism and Happiness. Imprint Academic.
- (2015). Inside Their Heads: Psychological Profiles of Famous People. Ryelands Publishing.

== See also ==
- List of animal rights advocates
- Sentiocentrism
