= Norm Phelps =

American animal rights activist (1939–2014)

- Born: Norman Nelson Phelps, III; May 16, 1939; US
- Died: December 31, 2014 (aged 75); Meritus Medical Center, Hagerstown, Maryland, US
- Resting place: Maryland
- Education: University of Maryland, College Park
- Occupations: Author, animal advocate
- Spouse: Patti Rogers
- Children: 2 children Norman Nelson Phelps, IV and Kyra E (Phelps) Bleichner 5 grandchildren Quinn, TJ, Haley, Danny and Reagan
- Writing career
- Period: late 20th century; early 21st century
- Genre: Religious philosophy
- Subjects: vegetarianism, veganism, animal rights, spirituality
- Movements: Animal rights; religion and animal rights; religion; animal advocacy
- Website: animals and ethics

Norm Phelps (born Norman Nelson Phelps, III; May 16, 1939 – December 31, 2014) was an American animal rights activist, vegetarian and writer. He was a founding member of the Society of Ethical and Religious Vegetarians (SERV), and a former outreach director of the Fund for Animals. He authored four books on animal rights: The Dominion of Love: Animal Rights According to the Bible (2002), The Great Compassion: Buddhism and Animal Rights (2004), The Longest Struggle: Animal Advocacy from Pythagoras to PETA (2007), and Changing the Game: Animal Liberation in the Twenty-first Century (2015).

== Biography ==
Phelps spoke at numerous conferences, including the National Conference on Organized Resistance, the University of Oregon's Public Interest Environmental Law Conference, several of the annual Animal Rights Conferences sponsored by the Farm Animal Rights Movement (FARM), and the Compassionate Living Festival. He also published articles, essays, and book reviews in several periodicals: Journal of Critical Animal Studies, Philosophia, Satya, The Animals’ Voice, and VegNews.

Phelps had become a vegetarian and then a vegan following the death of his dog Czar in 1984. As Phelps describes this change process on his website, "Czar was a person. He had a personality as individual and well-defined as any human being. He could love, he could trust, he could share, he could enjoy, he could fear, he could worry, he could look forward to the future and remember the past, he had a sense of who he was, and he would have sacrificed himself for me without a moment's hesitation. . . . If Czar was a person, what about other animals? What about cows, pigs, chickens and sheep? Weren't they people, too? How could we love some and eat others?"

In 1994, Phelps retired from the federal government and joined the campaigns office of The Fund for Animals in Silver Spring, Maryland, where he became active in the campaign to end the live pigeon shoot which was then held every Labor Day in the village of Hegins, Pennsylvania. The shoot ended in 1998. When The Fund for Animals merged with The Humane Society of the United States (HSUS), Phelps joined the staff of the HSUS wildlife protection campaign, where he worked until he resigned for reasons of age and health in 2011. From 2002 until his death in 2014, Phelps had suffered from myasthenia gravis, an auto-immune neuromuscular condition that causes severe fatigable weakness.

As an animal rights theorist, Phelps argues that the animal rights movement must: 1) Engage religious communities on the side of animal rights, 2) Join with progressive movements for social and economic justice and environmental protection to create a genuine universal rights movement, and 3) pursue a "two-track" strategy of advocating veganism and the abolition of all animal exploitation while simultaneously campaigning for more moderate reforms, such as Meatless Mondays and the abolition of battery cages for laying hens. Although he is generally opposed to militant direct action on the grounds that it is counterproductive, Phelps supported live rescues of animals from farms and laboratories. In 1994, he was arrested at a pigeon shoot in Pikeville, Pennsylvania for releasing 200 pigeons who were slated to become living targets. He spent two days in Berks County Prison and was subsequently convicted of malicious mischief.

He lived in Funkstown, Maryland (USA) with his second wife, Patti Rogers. Phelps died on December 31, 2014, at the age of 75.

== Education ==
- University of Maryland, College Park, BA, history, philosophy, 1958–1962.

== Publications ==
Books

- The Dominion of Love: Animal Rights According to the Bible. Lantern Books, New York, 2002. 208 pages.
- The Great Compassion: Buddhism and Animal Rights. Lantern Books, New York, 2004. 240 pages.
- The Longest Struggle: Animal Advocacy from Pythagoras to PETA. Lantern Books, New York, 2007. 368 pages.

Articles

- A Chronology of Animal Protection: Part I: The Ancient World - begins at 250,000 YBP
- Why the Animals Need Religion - cites religious social sources of compassion for animals and for humane reforms for animals
- An Open Letter to the Dalai Lama, June 15, 2007 - in which Phelps states that he had been practicing Tibetan Buddhism for more than 20 years
- Use a Sharp Knife: Animals and Islam
- Ethical Eating: Comments on the Unitarian Universalist Association's Draft Statement of Conscience

Audio podcasts

- Changing the Game, Part II (7/23/2013) - Transcription by Brandon Chung, 7/30/2013

Published Interviews

- The Dominion of Love: Interview with the Abolitionist Online
- The Great Compassion: Interview with the Abolitionist Online

Book Reviews

- Animals and the Holocaust: Eternal Treblinka by Charles Patterson
- Tales of Common Sorrow: Job Enters a Pain Clinic and Other Stories by Roberta Kalechofsky
- Trying to Walk before We Can Crawl: Speciesism by Joan Dunayer
- Speaking of the Unspeakable: the Holocaust and the Henmaid's Tale by Karen Davis

Video lectures

- History of the Animal Rights Movement (17:11), Apr 10, 2013, featured at the Animal Rights 2012 National Conference, organized by Farm Animal Rights Movement (FARM) of Bethesda, MD - argues for the secular roots of the animal rights movement, as 'the orphan child of the 1960s' and as having secularist roots from the European Enlightenment, contrasting it with the animal welfare movement which he said had emerged from 18th century religious roots, when contemplation of the moral meaning of sentience was centrally important to reflection on animals. Also distinguishes the 'new welfarism' of Humane Society of the United States from the abolitionism of Gary Francione.

== See also ==
- Alex Hershaft
- Buddhism
- Buddhist vegetarianism
- Christian Vegetarian Association
- Christian vegetarianism
- Ethical veganism
- Henry Spira
- Moral status of animals in the ancient world
- Oxford Group (animal rights)
- Richard Schwartz
- Roberta Kalechofsky
- Veganism
- Vegetarianism and religion
