= Animals, Men and Morals =

Collection of animal rights essays

Animals, Men and Morals: An Inquiry into the Maltreatment of Non-humans
- Author: Stanley and Roslind Godlovitch; John Harris (eds.)
- Illustrator: James Grashow, Friends of Animals
- Subject: Animal rights Moral philosophy
- Publisher: Victor Gollancz, London; Grove Press, New York
- Publication date: 1971
- Publication place: United Kingdom, United States
- Pages: 240
- ISBN: 0-394-17825-4
- LC Class: 73-20609

Animals, Men and Morals: An Inquiry into the Maltreatment of Non-humans (1971) is a collection of essays on animal rights, edited by Oxford philosophers Stanley and Roslind Godlovitch, both from Canada, and John Harris from the UK. The editors were members of the Oxford Group, a group of postgraduate philosophy students and others based at the University of Oxford from 1968, who began raising the idea of animal rights in seminars and campaigning locally against factory farming and otter hunting.

The book was ground-breaking in its time, because it was one of the early publications in the mid-20th century that argued clearly in favour of animal liberation/animal rights, rather than simply for compassion in the way animals are used. The editors wrote in the introduction: "Once the full force of moral assessment has been made explicit there can be no rational excuse left for killing animals, be they killed for food, science, or sheer personal indulgence."

== Origins ==
Apart from the Godlovitches and Harris, the group also included David Wood and sociology student Mike Peters. The Godlovitches had recently become vegan on moral grounds, and soon after Harris and Wood met them, the latter were also persuaded that the case against exploiting animals was unanswerable, and they also became vegan. The group then began to raise the issue in lectures and seminars in moral philosophy at Oxford, and also began local campaigning against factory farming, otter hunting, and other animal exploitation issues.

The initial inspiration for the book was the discovery of an article called "The Rights of Animals" by the novelist Brigid Brophy, which had been published in The Sunday Times in October 1965. Brophy's piece was devastating in its brief and unsentimental statement of the case for animal rights. It began:

Were it to be announced tomorrow that anyone who fancied it might, without risk of reprisals or recriminations, stand at a fourth story window, dangle out of it a length of string with a meal (labelled 'Free') on the end, wait until a chance passer-by took a bite and then, having entangled his cheek or gullet on a hook hidden in the food, haul him up to the fourth floor and there batter him to death with a knobkerrie, I do not think there would be many takers.

It concluded:

In point of fact, I am the very opposite of an anthromorphiser. I don't hold animals superior or even equal to humans. The whole case for behaving decently to animals rests on the fact that we are the superior species. We are the species uniquely capable of imagination, rationality and moral choice – and that is precisely why we are under the obligation to recognise and respect the rights of animals.

Soon after the Godlovitches and Harris read the article, the idea of creating a book, or symposium of articles, began to emerge. Much of what was written at that time about animal welfare was anthropomorphic and sentimental in tone. There was plainly a need for something which offered an alternative, in the form of a clear and rigorous philosophical and moral perspective. The group began to draw up a list of possible contributors. Members of the group went to London and visited Brophy, who was enthusiastic and agreed to contribute. Brophy then introduced the group to Richard D. Ryder, a clinical psychologist based in Oxford, who later agreed to write a piece on animal experimentation. The group began to visit publishers, and when they met Giles Gordon of Victor Gollancz, he persuaded them that they should themselves write chapters for the book, as well as better known authors, as this would make the whole more interesting. Gollancz also agreed to publish it.

The editors were uncompromising in their Introduction:

Once the full force of moral assessment has been made explicit there can be no rational excuse left for killing animals, be they killed for food, science, or sheer personal indulgence...should the reader himself find no fault in the positions he will find in these pages he is, as a rational being, committed to act in accordance with them. Should he fail to do so, he can only have been terribly misled since childhood about the nature of morality.

== Contents ==
The book contains essays by Ruth Harrison on factory farming; Muriel Dowding, founder of Beauty without Cruelty, on furs and cosmetics; Richard D. Ryder on animal testing; and Terence Hegarty from the Fund for the Replacement of Animals in Medical Experiments on alternatives.

John Harris writes about killing for food, Maureen Duffy about hunting, Brigid Brophy about the need for animal rights, Roslind and Stanley Godlovitch about the ethics, and Leonard Nelson (the German philosopher who died in 1927) about duties to animals. There are essays from David Wood and Michael Peters on the sociological position, and a postscript from Patrick Corbett, Professor of Philosophy at the University of Sussex. Corbett concluded with: "Let animal slavery join human slavery in the graveyard of the past!"

It was in Ryder's article that the word "speciesism" made its first appearance in an independent publication. Ryder had first used it in 1970 in a privately printed pamphlet, entitled "Speciesism," which he had distributed around Oxford and sent to the colleges. He argued in the book that speciesism is as illogical as racism, writing that "species" and "race" are both vague terms, and asked: "If, under special conditions, it were one day found possible to cross a professor of biology with an ape, would the offspring be kept in a cage or in a cradle?"

== Reception ==
The book got into trouble from the moment of publication, because two animal experimenters named by the editors in Ryder's piece objected to what had been written about them. The publisher Gollancz was forced by the threat of legal action to pay damages, and to put an errata slip in all copies. In terms of public reception, the unusual and radical approach taken by the book meant that it created a small stir in the United Kingdom. John Harris was interviewed on the PM programme, and appeared on local television. The book was also reviewed in several papers and journals.

But the way forward for animal rights as an issue was eventually to occur by a different route. The Australian philosopher Peter Singer had come to vegetarianism through meeting the Godlovitches when he was a postgraduate student in Oxford, and gave critical feedback on Roslind Godlovitch's contribution to the book. It was in his review of the book for The New York Review of Books in 1973 that Singer first used the term "animal liberation," writing that "Animals, Men and Morals is a manifesto for an Animal Liberation movement." The article prompted the New York Review to commission a book on the subject from Singer, which was published as Animal Liberation (1975), and which became one of the animal rights movement's canonical texts.

== See also ==
- For a recent and detailed account of the history of the Oxford Group and the publication of Animals, Men and Morals see The Oxford Group and the Emergence of the Animal Rights Movement, R. Garner and Y Okuleye, OUP December 2020.
- Henry Stephens Salt
- List of animal rights advocates
