= David Wood (philosopher) =

British philosopher, born 1946

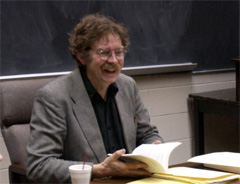
- Wood at Vanderbilt University
- Born: 1946 (age 79–80); Oxford, England

Education
- Education: University of Manchester; New College, Oxford

Philosophical work
- Era: 20th-century philosophy
- Region: Western philosophy
- School: Continental philosophy
- Main interests: Ontology; Ethics; Metaphysics; German Idealism; Philosophy of Nature; Phenomenology; Deconstruction
- Notable ideas: Performative reflexivity

David Wood (born 1946) was Centennial Professor of Philosophy, and Joe B. Wyatt Distinguished University Professor, at Vanderbilt University.

Wood has taught philosophy in Europe and the United States for over thirty years, and is the author of 16 books. In addition to teaching at Vanderbilt University, he also co-directed (with Beth Conklin) a research programme in ecology and spirituality for the Centre for the Study of Religion and Culture.

== Background ==
Wood was born in Oxford, England. He was an undergraduate at the University of Manchester, where he was introduced to phenomenology by Wolfe Mays. He went on to do graduate work in philosophy at New College, Oxford (1968–1971), where through the good offices of Alan Montefiore (at Balliol College) Jacques Derrida was a frequent visitor. Under the influence of a group of animal rights activists led by Roslind and Stanley Godlovitch – now known as the Oxford Group; Peter Singer, author of Animal Liberation (1975) was associated with them – he became a vegetarian and started Ecology Action, a short-lived environmental group.

He was subsequently hired by the University of Warwick, where he went on to become chair of the philosophy department and director of the Centre for Research in Philosophy and Literature. In 1974 he studied in Paris, and attended lectures by Claude Lévi-Strauss, Michel Foucault, Jacques Derrida, Paul Ricoeur and Michel Serres. He left Warwick for Vanderbilt in 1994, where he became chair in 1995.

He has been a visiting academic at Berkeley, Yale and Stony Brook, and has taught at Duquesne and Turin. He is an honorary Professor of Philosophy at Warwick where he ran a research seminar (Fatal Projections: Pathologies of Alterity) in Spring 2006.

He is also an active sculptor and earth-artist.

== Bibliography ==
=== Books authored ===
- Reoccupy Earth (2019).
- Time after Time (2007).
- The Step Back: Ethics and Politics after Deconstruction (2005).
- Thinking after Heidegger (2002).
- Philosophy at the Limit (1990).
- The Deconstruction of Time (1988; 2nd edn. 2001).
- " Deep Time, Dark Times: On Being Geologically Human (2018)

=== Books edited ===
- Eco-Deconstruction Derrida and Environmental Philosophy with Matthias Fritsch and Philippe Lynes (2019).
- Truth (2005). with José Medina.
- On Derrida, Heidegger and Spirit (1993).
- Derrida: A Critical Reader (1992).
- On Paul Ricoeur: Narrative and Interpretation (1992).
- Writing the Future (1990).
- Philosophers' Poets (1990).
- The Provocation of Levinas (1988). With Robert Bernasconi.
- Exceedingly Nietzsche: Essays in Contemporary Nietzsche Interpretation (1988). With David Farrell Krell.
- Derrida and Différance (1985). With Robert Bernasconi.
- Time and Metaphysics (1982). With Robert Bernasconi.
- Heidegger and Language (1981).

== See also ==
- List of deconstructionists
