= Paul Waldau =

American ethicist (born 1950)

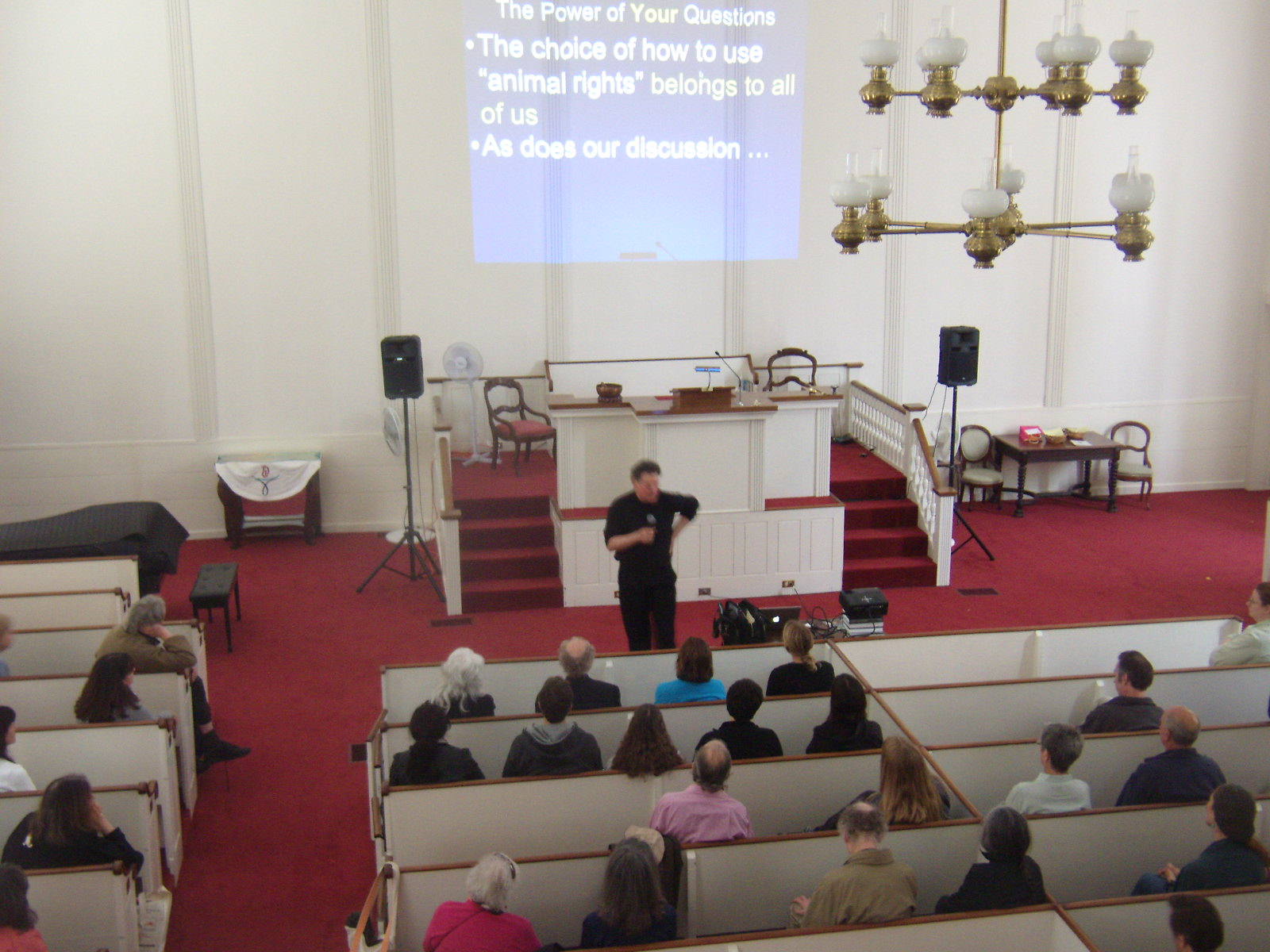
- Born: Paul Francis Waldau; January 16, 1950 (age 76)
- Spouse: Judith Strang-Waldau

Academic background
- Education: University of California, Santa Barbara; University of California, Los Angeles; Stanford University; University of Oxford
- Doctoral advisor: Keith Ward

Academic work
- Discipline: Animal studies
- Sub-discipline: Anthrozoology
- Institutions: Tufts University; Canisius College
- Main interests: Animal rights; animal ethics; animal law
- Notable works: The Specter of Speciesism (2001); A Communion of Subjects (2006)
- Website: paulwaldau.com

Paul Francis Waldau (born January 16, 1950) is an American ethicist and former professor at Canisius College in Buffalo, New York, where he headed the graduate program on anthrozoology, which he founded. He has several times served as Barker Lecturer in animal law at Harvard Law School, and is the author of a number of books on animal rights and speciesism.

Waldau has also served as the legal director of the Great Ape Project, which campaigns for rights for chimpanzees, gorillas and orangutans.

He has served as President of the Religion and Animals Institute since 2003.

== Books ==
- (2001). The Specter of Speciesism: Buddhist and Christian Views of Animals. Oxford University Press.
- (ed.) (2006). A Communion of Subjects: Animals in Religion, Science, and Ethics. Columbia University Press.
- (ed.) (2008). An Elephant in the Room: The Science and Well-being of Elephants in Captivity. Center for Animals and Public Policy.
- (2011). Animal Rights: What Everyone Needs to Know. Oxford University Press.
- (forthcoming). The Animal Invitation: Religion, Law, Science and Ethics in a More-Than-Human World.
- (2013). Animal Studies: An Introduction. Oxford University Press.
