= The Case for Animal Rights =

1983 book by Tom Regan

- Cover of the first edition
- Author: Tom Regan
- Language: English
- Subjects: Animal rights
- Publisher: University of California Press
- Publication date: 1983
- Publication place: United States
- Media type: Print (hardcover and paperback)
- Pages: 474 (2004 paperback edition)
- ISBN: 978-0520243866
- Preceded by: All That Dwell Therein: Essays on Animal Rights and Environmental Ethics
- Followed by: Animal Sacrifices: Religious Perspectives on the Use of Animals in Science

The Case for Animal Rights is a 1983 book by the American philosopher Tom Regan, in which the author argues that at least some kinds of non-human animals have moral rights because they are the "subjects-of-a-life", and that these rights adhere to them whether or not they are recognized. The work is considered an important text within animal rights theory.

== Arguments ==
Immanuel Kant argued narrowly that all humans are "subjects-of-a-life" (see definition below, and compare subjectivity), and so possess inherent value. Thus, they must be treated as ends-in-themselves, never as a means to an end. Regan extends this position to non-humans. He also argues that, while being the subject-of-a-life is a sufficient condition for having intrinsic value, it is not a necessary one: an individual might not be the subject-of-a-life, yet still possesses intrinsic value.

The argument is a deontological one, as opposed to consequentialist. If an individual possesses a moral right to not be used as a means to an end, that right ought not be sacrificed, even if the consequences of doing so are considered appealing. Regan challenges Kant's assertion that moral patienthood is predicated on rationality by observing, following Jeremy Bentham, that this theory would not allow for irrational humans to possess moral status, and proposes the possession of a subjectivity instead. He describes his "subject-of-a-life criterion" as follows:

[It] involves more than merely being alive and more than merely being conscious. ... individuals are subjects-of-a-life if they have beliefs and desires; perception, memory, and a sense of the future, including their own future; an emotional life together with feelings of pleasure and pain; preference- and welfare-interests; the ability to initiate action in pursuit of their desires and goals; a psychophysical identity over time; and an individual welfare in the sense that their experiential life fares well or ill for them, logically independently of their utility for others and logically independently of their being the object of anyone else's interests. Those who satisfy the subject-of-a-life criterion themselves have a distinctive kind of value – inherent value – and are not to be viewed or treated as mere receptacles."

Regan argues that normally mental mammals over a year old satisfy the conditions, including most human beings, with the possible exception of those in persistent vegetative states, as do several species of birds, and possibly fish. The key attribute is that – following Thomas Nagel's "What Is it Like to Be a Bat?" (1974) – there is something that it is like to be those individuals; they are the subjects of experience, whose lives matter to them as individuals, even if they do not matter to anyone else.

In addition, Regan rejects the idea of denying animals rights by social contract theory, as he makes the argument that young children are also "unable to sign contracts", but are afforded rights anyway. Furthermore, he makes the argument that if he were to approach animal rights through human social contract, when somebody kicks one's dog, it is only morally wrong because it upsets the person, and not because a wrong has been done towards the dog, which he does not find sensible.

Regan argues that rights are not always absolute as there are times when to respect someone's right not to be harmed, another's right not to be harmed must be overridden. He states that when faced with overriding the rights of many innocent beings versus the rights of few innocent beings—when each individual involved would be equally harmed—we should override the rights of the few. He also states when individuals involved are not harmed in a comparable way given a certain course of action, we should mitigate the situation of those who would be worse-off. Thus, if the harm of a few innocent beings is greater than the harm to many innocent beings, the right action is to override the rights of the many. As this relates to animal rights, Regan asserts the harm in the death of an animal is not tantamount to the harm in the death of a normal, healthy human. This is supposedly because the ending of an animal life entails the loss of fewer opportunities when compared to the loss of a normal, healthy human.

Regan, to critique consequentialist ethics, provides a hypothetical in which he describes murdering a rich relative for a fortune in wealth, some of which he donates for a tax cut to a local children's hospital, resulting in the well-being of the children, their relatives, and their friends. He maintains that most people would find such an action unpalatable, and uses this to critique Peter Singer's hedonic utilitarianism. He further asserts that as the motives in the hypothetical were not noble to begin with, such an action was actually immoral, even if it did result in some positive consequences.

Finally, Regan concludes that animal exploitation in modern society is not justifiable, as animal industries view animals as a means to an end for trivial reasons; meat is not necessary for health, most cases of animal testing are for unnecessary consumer products, and hunting is similarly unnecessary. He therefore advocates abolishing the exploitation of animals for food, animal testing, and commercial hunting.

== Reviews ==
The Case for Animal Rights quickly established a prominent place for itself in the literature on the moral status of animals. "Since its publication in 1983 this work has been a benchmark for debate on the topic by critics, whether they are friends or foes of the rights view.” Philosopher Evelyn Pluhar calls it “an extremely impressive, richly argued defense of nonhuman animal moral significance.” Philosopher Robert Nozik, who disagrees with many of Regan’s arguments and conclusions, nevertheless calls the book “lucid, closely reasoned, and dispassionate”. Legal scholar Rebecca Dresser says, “Some readers will criticize The Case for Animal Rights as politically unrealistic. Yet Regan confronts us with a compelling moral challenge to our current attitudes and behavior toward animals. His skillful analysis and argument add powerful theoretical fuel to the political fire.”

The moral philosopher Mary Midgley notes in the London Review of Books that Regan builds on the work of Peter Singer, commenting that "utilitarianism [Singer's position], though strong today, is only one side of our current morality". Midgley states, "Essentially I think he [Regan] is right ... Persuasion is needed, not in the sense of illicit emotional pressure, but of imaginative restatement. From this angle, the strategy of Regan’s book is faulty. It is too abstract and too contentious. As tends to happen with American academic books in the Rawlsian tradition, the relation between theory and practice is oversimplified. There is too much attention paid to the winning of arguments and too little to the complexities of the world."

Midgley also notes, "Ought it [the Kantian idea of morality] really to be used – as it still very often is – to exclude animals from serious consideration? This is Regan’s question and he deals with it soundly. He does not find it hard to show that the notion of humanity which this Kantian view encapsulates is far too narrow, hard to defend at any time, and increasingly so today. … The core of Regan’s argument is, then, this concept of an independent, conscious being. Reversing the traditional approach, he puts the burden of proof on those who claim that some such beings do not matter."

With regard to future debate, Midgley states:

It would certainly be better to relate ‘rights’ more clearly to a background of other moral concepts, with much more attention to the priority systems by which we deal with conflicts. And – to consider the future – we urgently need now to move the controversy in the direction of asking what we mean by rights and by equality, rather than continuing with any more simple yes-or-no battles about whether animals have them. Regan’s book is certainly important and in many ways admirable – a serious, substantial contribution to giving animals their proper place on the philosophical map.

Regan responds to objections from some of his critics in a lengthy preface to the 2004 edition of the book.

== See also ==
- Animal Liberation (book)
- Intrinsic value (ethics)
- Natural and legal rights
