= Brigid Brophy =

English author, literary critic and polemicist (1929–1995)

- Born: Brigid Antonia Brophy; 12 June 1929; Ealing, England
- Died: 7 August 1995 (aged 66); Louth, Lincolnshire, England
- Occupations: Author and literary critic
- Spouse: Michael Levey
- Parent: John Brophy (father)
- Writing career
- Genres: Short stories, novels, plays, non-fiction studies, literary criticism.
- Notable works: Hackenfeller's Ape (1953); Flesh (1962); The Snow Ball (1964)

Brigid Antonia Brophy (married name Brigid Levey, later Lady Levey; 12 June 1929 – 7 August 1995) was an English author, literary critic and polemicist. She was an influential campaigner who agitated for many types of social reform, including homosexual parity, vegetarianism, humanism, and animal rights. Brophy appeared frequently on television and in the newspapers of the 1960s and 1970s, making her prominent both in literary circles and on the wider cultural scene.

Brophy's major achievements include igniting contemporary debate about animal rights, and the establishment of the Public Lending Right by which writers in the UK receive a payment each time their book is borrowed from a public library.

== Biography ==
Born in London to the writer John Brophy and his teacher wife, Charis, Brigid Brophy's education was fragmented by her wartime attendance at many different schools, including St Paul's Girls' School, in London's Brook Green, and The Abbey School, Reading. A precocious child, her literary talents were kindled by her father, who encouraged her to read the authors he admired, including George Bernard Shaw, John Milton and Evelyn Waugh. Aged 15, Brophy gained a scholarship to Oxford University. She studied classics at St Hugh's College; however, she did not gain a degree: the authorities asked her not to return after her fourth term. (This caused Brophy such severe upset that afterwards she only sketched the reasons for it, citing frowned-upon sexual activity and drunkenness.) After a period of psychological turmoil, Brophy worked as a shorthand-typist and shared a rented flat near London Zoo with a friend from Oxford.

At a party, Brophy met art historian Michael Levey (afterwards Director of the National Gallery 1973–87, and knighted in 1981), and they married in 1954. They had one daughter, Katharine (Kate) Levey, in 1957. Brophy and Levey rejected sexual orthodoxy and each partner was free to enjoy outside relationships; this unconventional set-up was happy. For some years, Brophy had a complex amorous liaison with Iris Murdoch, and later a stable love partnership with writer Maureen Duffy. When that was suddenly ended by Duffy in 1979, Brophy had a severe emotional crisis, which she believed played a part in her developing difficulty in walking. It was some time before her symptoms were diagnosed as late-onset multiple sclerosis: Brophy was then in her 50s.

In 1987, Levey resigned from his demanding role as Director of the National Gallery in order to better care for Brophy. Brophy had always been a punctilious correspondent and an indefatigable worker; she continued to write even while her mobility declined. However, following increasing debilitation and needing full-time care, Brophy unwillingly left London in 1991. She was cared for in a nursing home in Lincolnshire, in the town to which her husband and daughter had moved. Levey devoted each afternoon to visiting his wife until she died, aged 66, in 1995.

== Fiction ==
In 1953, when she was in her early twenties, Brophy became a published author with the issue of her volume of short stories, The Crown Princess. It was critically admired, yet she subsequently disowned the book. In the same year, the first of her seven novels, Hackenfeller's Ape, appeared. The stimulus for the novel was Brophy's living within earshot of the roar of caged lions in London Zoo; from childhood Brophy had been sympathetic to the plight of non-human animals. The plot involves the plan to send a captive ape into space as a scientific experiment and the attempt to foil this plan. Hackenfeller's Ape was commended for its originality, and was awarded first prize for a debut novel at the Cheltenham Literary Festival; the attendant publicity established Brophy as a novelist. She continued, however, to publish short stories.

The King of A Rainy Country (1956) follows Susan and her nearly-boyfriend Neale in their quest for a girl Susan had loved at school. The novel is both funny and elegiac, and is thought to be the nearest Brophy came to autobiography. Flesh (1962) charts the course of the initially-diffident Marcus, whose mature impulses amusingly lead him to bodily excess. The Finishing Touch (1963) is a light piece, playing on the aerated, wispy dialogue of Ronald Firbank, an undervalued writer whom Brophy much praised. The novel portrays Anthony Blunt, an art historian known to Levey, in the guise of a headmistress of a finishing school.

With characteristic firmness of judgement Brophy recognised her next novel, The Snow Ball (1964), as a masterpiece: set at a sumptuous costume ball on New Year's Eve in the 1960s, the novel is sparked by the Mozart opera that Brophy thought most perfect, Don Giovanni. Described by a reviewer for The Guardian as a "swirling, sumptuous, sensual feast of a book", The Snow Ball is an account of seduction that revels in sensual detail, its dialogue witty and profound. As Giles Gordon noted, it is considered Brophy's finest novel, and following its initial publication by Secker & Warburg would be reprinted several times, as a Corgi paperback, then in 1979 by Allison & Busby (alongside their reissues of Hackenfeller's Ape and Flesh), and most recently by Faber and Faber in 2020.

The novel In Transit (1969) takes place in an airport lounge, where the protagonist has "lost", and is seeking to rediscover, his/her sex. Brophy plays with narrative consciousness; the text is dense with puns and allusions, forming a captivating consideration of gender and sexual orientation, language and meaning; overall, there is a serious political point. In Transit is considered Brophy's most radical in form, leading to her being hailed a postmodern writer. The Adventures of God in his Search for the Black Girl (1973) is described in its subtitle as "a novel and some fables". (The title inverts Shaw's The Adventures of the Black Girl in Her Search for God.) The volume contains some of Brophy's most pointed and poignant short stories, and an inventive discursive scenario where ideas are challenged.

Brophy's last novel, Palace Without Chairs (1978), is set in a fictitious European kingdom. The royal family is democratic, domestic, but at court politics intrude. Prince Ulrich, heir to the throne, subverts the expectations of his position, rebelling in ways to which Brophy is clearly sympathetic.

Brophy's irrepressible imagination was not only fertile but versatile. As well as short stories (and plays and poems that remain unpublished), Brophy produced Pussy Owl (1976), a book for children that features her invented "Superbeast", the narcissistic, stomping progeny of Edward Lear's "The Owl and the Pussycat". BBC television devoted an episode of Jackanory to Pussy Owl.

Her performed and published plays are a play for radio, The Waste Disposal Unit (broadcast in 1964), and her farce for the theatre, The Burglar (which opened in Brighton, transferring to London's West End in 1967). The Burglar had a short run; it was a singular and stinging flop.

== Non-fiction ==
Brophy was a ceaseless worker, often dealing with several different types of project simultaneously. As well as composing fiction, at times in a creative frenzy, she undertook extensive research for her non-fiction. Her first published study was Black Ship to Hell (1962). The title refers to the Greek myth of the underworld. In this wide-ranging study, Brophy illuminates the origins of man's self- destructive forces, taking a Freudian analytical approach.

Much in demand as a provocative, often acerbic literary critic, Brophy reviewed books for journals and newspapers. She was also an essayist and wrote pamphlets for the causes she supported. She was a prolific contributor to the opinion columns and letters pages of the press, seldom missing an opportunity to comment on matters such as vivisection, the Vietnam War, or censorship – all of which she vehemently and cogently opposed. In addition, she did not shrink from pointing out factual errors or a piece of sophistry she had spotted.

Her later critical explorations were Mozart the Dramatist (1964, revised 1990), in which Brophy expounds Mozart's flair for presenting authentic psychology in his dramas. In Prancing Novelist: A Defence of Fiction in the Form of a Critical Biography in Praise of Ronald Firbank (1973), Brophy explores the life and mind of Firbank, in a framework that justifies the value of the genre he employed.

A collaboration with her husband Michael Levey and their friend Charles Osborne appeared in 1967, to considerable clamour in the press. Fifty Works of English Literature We Could Do Without debunks the canon of texts traditionally served up to students and general readers and accepted as "great literature". It was a deliberately provocative volume, and some critics were outraged by the trio's cheek.

Brophy wrote two books on Aubrey Beardsley (Black and White, published in 1968, and Beardsley and His World in 1976), the draughtsman whose mastery of black ink on white Brophy not only much admired but profoundly understood. In 1983, The Prince and the Wild Geese appeared. With a largely pictorial format, the book follows the attempted romance between a Russian Prince and an Irish girl, who in fact rejected him. The watercolours reproduced are by Prince Gagarin himself.

Brophy devised a literary panel game, Take It Or Leave It, where well-known authors participated.

In 1969, Brophy collaborated with Maureen Duffy to exhibit, at a London gallery, a display of their home-made three-dimensional "heads and boxes", which they designated "Prop Art". The playful-yet-serious items were offered for sale, and although few were bought, there was a ripple of publicity, some of it puzzled. Each artefact illustrated or evoked abstract concepts, using visual and verbal puns to plunder the unconscious mind and reveal punchy connections.

In the early 1970s, Brophy, with Michael Levey, Maureen Duffy and two others formed the Writers Action Group (WAG, pronounced "wag") to press for authors to receive a small payment each time one of their works was borrowed from a public library in the UK. This system is still operant today, and the Public Lending Right (PLR) authors receive is much appreciated. In a seven-year campaign which took up almost all Brophy's time, she succeeded in bringing about something her late father, John Brophy, had agitated for in the early 1950s. He had conceived the notion of "The Brophy Penny" (his idea was for a different funding format, whereas a founding principle of Brigid Brophy's scheme was that it would be funded by central government). The Writers Action Group recruited support from writers, then organised shrewd publicity, including a demonstration with placards in central London. With help from a few sympathetic parliamentarians, the PLR UK Bill was finally passed in 1979. Brophy later wrote an informative and entertaining guide to PLR (see list of non-fiction works, below).

== Animal rights ==
The Sunday Times invited Brophy to write an opinion-piece; Brophy's response was The Rights of Animals (1965). This incisive article was much discussed. As a parallel to Paine's essays The Rights of Man, The Rights of Animals made Brophy influential to the animal rights movement. She gave a speech at the annual general meeting of the National Anti-Vivisection Society at Charing Cross Hotel in 1970. Her article was published in the 1971 book Animals, Men and Morals. Brophy continued to publish articles related to animal rights, including an influential 1981 article in the London Review of Books entitled "Cruelty to Animals", in which she made strong arguments against any moral or ethical basis for vivisection as part of critical review of books by James Turner and Solly Zuckerman published that same year.

Brophy became a vegetarian at the age of 25. Her daughter and husband became vegetarian. She did not wear leather.

== Bibliography ==
=== Fiction ===
- The Crown Princess and Other Stories (London: Collins, 1953; New York: Viking, 1953)
- Hackenfeller's Ape (Rupert Hart-Davis, 1953; reprinted Allison & Busby, 1979; Virago Modern Classics, 1991; Faber Editions, 2023)
- The King of a Rainy Country (Secker & Warburg, 1956; reprinted Virago Modern Classics, 1990, 2012)
- Flesh (Secker & Warburg, 1962; Allison & Busby, 1979)
- The Finishing Touch (1963, revised 1987)
- The Snow Ball (Villiers Pub., 1964, reprinted Allison & Busby, 1979; Cardinal, 1990; Faber, 2020)
- The Burglar (play, first produced in London at the Vaudeville Theatre, 22 February 1967, and published 1968)
- In Transit: An Heroi-Cyclic Novel (1969, reprinted 2002)
- The Adventures of God in His Search for the Black Girl: A Novel and Some Fables (1973)
- Pussy Owl: Superbeast (1976), for children, illustrated by Hilary Hayton
- Palace Without Chairs: A Baroque Novel (Hamish Hamilton, 1978)

=== Non-fiction ===
- Black Ship to Hell (1962)
- Mozart the Dramatist: A New View of Mozart, His Operas and His Age (1964) (revised 1990)
- Don't Never Forget: Collected Views and Reviews (1966)
- (With Michael Levey, and Charles Osborne) Fifty Works of English and American Literature We Could Do Without (1967)
- Religious Education in State Schools (1967)
- Don't Never Forget: Collected Views and Reviews (1967)
- Black and White: A Portrait of Aubrey Beardsley (1968)
- The Rights of Animals (1969. Animal Defence and Anti-Vivisection Society)
- The Longford Threat to Freedom (1972)
- Prancing Novelist: A Defence of Fiction in the Form of a Critical Biography in Praise of Ronald Firbank (1973)
- Beardsley and His World (1976)
- The Prince and the Wild Geese, pictures by Gregoire Gagarin (Hamish Hamilton, 1983)
- A Guide to Public Lending Right (1983)
- Baroque 'n' Roll and Other Essays (1987)
- Reads: A Collection of Essays (1989)

=== Contributor ===
- Best Short Plays of the World Theatre, 1958–1967, 1968
- Animals, Men and Morals, edited by Stanley and Roslind Godlovitch and John Harris (1971)
- The Genius of Shaw, edited by Michael Holroyd (1979)
- Animal Rights: A Symposium, edited by D. Paterson and R. D. Ryder (1979)
- Shakespeare Stories, edited by Giles Gordon (1982)

A collection of Brophy's manuscripts is housed in Lilly Library at Indiana University at Bloomington.
