= Animal Liberation (book) =

1975 book by Peter Singer

- Cover of the first edition
- Author: Peter Singer
- Language: English
- Subject: Animal rights
- Publisher: HarperCollins
- Publication date: 1975 (first edition); 1990 (second edition); 2002 (third edition); 2009 (fourth edition); 2015 (40th anniversary edition); 2023 (revised edition)
- Publication place: United States
- Media type: Print (hardcover and paperback) and eBook
- Pages: 311 (2009 edition)
- ISBN: 978-0-06-171130-5 (2009 edition)
- LC Class: HV4708 .S56

Animal Liberation: A New Ethics for Our Treatment of Animals is a 1975 book by the Australian philosopher Peter Singer. It is widely considered within the animal liberation movement to be the founding philosophical statement of its ideas. Singer himself rejected the use of the theoretical framework of rights when it comes to human and nonhuman animals. Following Jeremy Bentham, Singer argued that the interests of animals should be considered because of their ability to experience suffering and that the idea of rights was not necessary in order to consider them. He popularized the term "speciesism" in the book, which had been coined by Richard D. Ryder to describe the exploitative treatment of animals.

A revised edition, Animal Liberation Now, was released in 2023.

== Summary ==
Singer allows that animal rights are not the same as human rights, writing in Animal Liberation that "there are obviously important differences between humans and other animals, and these differences must give rise to some differences in the rights that each have."

In Animal Liberation, Singer argues against what he calls speciesism: discrimination on the grounds that a being belongs to a certain species. He holds the interests of all beings capable of suffering to be worthy of equal consideration and that giving lesser consideration to beings based on their species is no more justified than discrimination based on skin color. He argues that animals' rights should be based on their capacity to feel pain instead of their intelligence. In particular, he argues that while animals show lower intelligence than the average human, many severely intellectually challenged humans show equally diminished, if not lower, mental capacity and that some animals have displayed signs of intelligence (for example, primates learning elements of American sign language and other symbolic languages) sometimes on a par with that of human children. Therefore, intelligence does not provide a basis for giving nonhuman animals any less consideration than such intellectually challenged humans. Singer concludes that the most practical solution is to adopt a vegetarian or vegan diet. He also condemns vivisection except where the benefit (in terms of improved medical treatment, etc.) outweighs the harm done to the animals used.

== Reception ==
Activist Ingrid Newkirk wrote of Animal Liberation, "It forever changed the conversation about our treatment of animals. It made people—myself included—change what we ate, what we wore, and how we perceived animals." Other activists who claim that their attitudes to animals changed after reading the book include Peter Tatchell and Matt Ball.

Singer has expressed regret that the book did not have more impact. In September 1999, he was quoted by Michael Specter in The New Yorker on the book's impact:

It's had effects around the margins, of course, but they have mostly been minor. When I wrote it, I really thought the book would change the world. I know it sounds a little grand now, but at the time the 1960s still existed for us. It looked as if real changes were possible, and I let myself believe that this would be one of them. All you have to do is walk around the corner to McDonald's to see how successful I have been.

The book has also received critical challenges to the utilitarian underpinnings of his theory towards animal rights. In Slate, published in 2001, Richard Posner wrote that Singer failed to see the "radicalism of the ethical vision that powers [his] view on animals, an ethical vision that finds greater value in a healthy pig than in a profoundly intellectually challenged child, that commands inflicting a lesser pain on a human being to avert a greater pain to a dog, and that, provided only that a chimpanzee has 1 percent of the mental ability of a normal human being, would require the sacrifice of the human being to save 101 chimpanzees." Singer replied to and rejected this claim, engaging in a lengthy debate with Posner.

In addition, Martha Nussbaum has argued that the capability approach provides a more adequate foundation of justice than Utilitarianism can supply. Utilitarianism, Nussbaum argues, ignores adaptive preferences, elides the separateness of distinct persons, misidentifies valuable human/non-human emotions such as grief, and calculates according to "sum-rankings" rather than inviolable protection of intrinsic entitlements.

The moral philosopher Roger Scruton criticised Singer's works, including Animal Liberation, saying that they "contain little or no philosophical argument. They derive their radical moral conclusions from a vacuous utilitarianism that counts the pain and pleasure of all living things as equally significant and that ignores just about everything that has been said in our philosophical tradition about the real distinction between persons and animals."

== Personal background ==
In the essay "Animal Liberation: A Personal View", Singer describes the personal background that led to his adoption of the views he sets out in Animal Liberation. His interest was sparked following a lunch in 1970 with a fellow Oxford graduate student, Richard Keshen, who avoided meat. This led Singer to ask why Keshen had made that choice, and then to read Ruth Harrison's book, Animal Machines, as well as a paper by Roslind Godlovitch (who would later co-edit Animals, Men and Morals), which convinced him to become a vegetarian and to take animal suffering seriously as a philosophical issue.

== Animal Liberation Now ==
A revised edition, titled Animal Liberation Now: The Definitive Classic Renewed, was released on 23 May 2023, featuring a new foreword by Yuval Noah Harari. Two-thirds of the book consists of entirely new material, and it also documents changes in animal welfare since the book's original publication, along with other developments, such as the impact of meat consumption on climate and on the risk of spreading dangerous new viruses.

== See also ==
- The Case for Animal Rights
- Tom Regan
- List of vegan and plant-based media
