= List of animal rights advocates =

Advocates of animal rights believe that many or all sentient animals have moral worth that is independent of their utility for humans, and that their most basic interests—such as in avoiding suffering—should be afforded the same consideration as similar interests of human beings. They employ a variety of methods including direct action to oppose animal agriculture. Many animal rights advocates argue that non-human animals should be regarded as persons whose interests deserve legal protection.

== Background ==
The animal rights movement emerged in the 19th century, focused largely on opposition to vivisection, and in the 1960s the modern movement sprang up in England around the Hunt Saboteurs Association. In the 1970s, the Australian and American philosophers Peter Singer and Tom Regan began to provide the movement with its philosophical foundations. Singer argued for animal liberation on the basis of utilitarianism, first in 1973 in The New York Review of Books and later in his Animal Liberation (1975), while Regan developed a deontological theory of animal rights in several papers from 1975 onwards, followed by The Case for Animal Rights (1983). A distinction persists within the movement—based on the utilitarian–deontological divide—between those who seek incremental reform, a position known as animal protectionism, and those on the abolitionist side, who argue that reform that aims to regulate, rather than abolish, the property status of animals is counterproductive.

Historically speaking, it can be argued that the genesis of the animal rights movement was in India given the impact that both Buddhism and Jainism had on people in India and the neighbouring countries in Asia. The country with the largest number and highest percentage of vegetarians is India. Buddhism among the global religions is an animal rights religion par excellence. It has long subscribed to the belief that all life forms including that of non-human animals are sacred and deserving of respect, and extolls kindness and compassion as utmost virtues worthy of cultivation. Buddhism unreservedly embraces all living beings in its ethical cosmology without discrimination on grounds of species, race, or creed. Buddhist tenets—including the first precept, "Do not kill"—extend to both human and non-human sentient beings. The Buddha was so adamant and protective of the more vulnerable members of the moral community—namely the animals—that, as recorded in Dhammapada, he declared: "He who has laid aside the cudgel that injures any creature whether moving or still, who neither slays nor causes to be slain—him I call an Arya (Noble person)." The earliest reference to the idea of non-violence to animals (pashu-ahimsa), apparently in a moral sense, is in the Kapisthala Katha Samhita of the Yajurveda (KapS 31.11), a Hindu text written about the 8th century BCE. Several Hindu, Jain, and Buddhist texts appearing in the following centuries, including the Tamil moral texts of the Tirukkural and the Naladiyar, emphasize on ahimsa and moral vegetarianism, which is equated to today's veganism.

== List ==
The following is a list of animal rights advocates from all positions within the movement, from academics to activists.

Overview of animal rights advocates
Name	Born	Image	Country of birth	Occupation	Source
Elisa Aaltola	1976		Finland	Philosopher, author of Animal Individuality: Cultural and Moral Categorisations (2006) and Animal Suffering: Philosophy and Culture (2012)	
Carol J. Adams	1951		United States	Eco-feminist writer, author of The Sexual Politics of Meat (1990)	
Bryan Adams	1959		Canada	Musician, campaigner for People for the Ethical Treatment of Animals	
Douglas Adams	1952–2001		United Kingdom	Writer, campaigner for the Great Ape Project	
Cleveland Amory	1917–1998		United States	Founder of the Fund for Animals, president of the New England Anti-Vivisection Society	
Pamela Anderson	1967		Canada	Model, campaigner for People for the Ethical Treatment of Animals	
Claudine André	1946		Belgium	Conservationist, founded the bonobo sanctuary Lola ya bonobo	
James Aspey	1986		Australia	Fitness trainer, animal rights lecturer	
Michael Aufhauser	1952		Germany	Founder of Gut Aiderbichl, an animal sanctuary	
Greg Avery	1963		United Kingdom	Co-founder of the Consort beagles, Hillgrove cats, and SHAC campaigns	
Matt Ball	1968		United States	Co-founder and President of One Step for Animals, Senior Media Relations Specialist for The Good Food Institute, vegan, co-author of The Animal Activist's Handbook (2009)	
Martin Balluch	1954		Austria	Co-founder of Vegane Gesellschaft Österreich, president of Verein Gegen Tierfabriken	
Neal D. Barnard	1953		United States	President of Physicians Committee for Responsible Medicine	
Shane and Sia Barbi	1963		United States	Models	
Brigitte Bardot	1934–2025		France	Former actress, animal rights activist, founder of the Brigitte Bardot Foundation	
Bob Barker	1923–2023		United States	Former host of The Price Is Right, animal rights activist	
Gene Baur	1962		United States	Founder of Farm Sanctuary	
Tom Beauchamp	1939-2025		United States	Professor of Philosophy at Georgetown University, co-author of The Human Use of Animals (1998)	
Marc Bekoff	1945		United States	Professor Emeritus of Ecology and Evolutionary Biology at the University of Colorado, Boulder, co-founder with Jane Goodall of Ethologists for the Ethical Treatment of Animals	
Jeremy Bentham	1748–1832		United Kingdom	Philosopher, author of the oft-quoted "The question is not, Can they reason? nor, Can they talk? but, Can they suffer?"	
Steven Best	1955		United States	Philosopher, former Animal Liberation Press Office spokesperson	
Yves Bonnardel	1967	Yves Bonnardel 3 septembre 2017	France	Philosopher, field activist and theorist, publisher, lecturer and essayist	
Michela Vittoria Brambilla	1967		Italy	Politician	
Brigid Brophy	1929–1995		United Kingdom	Writer, author of article, "The Rights of Animals", in The Sunday Times, London, 1965.	
Mel Broughton	1960		United Kingdom	Co-founder of the SPEAK campaign	
Joseph Buddenberg	1984		United States	Mink liberator, twice indicted on Animal Enterprise Terrorism Act charges. Served two years in federal prison for liberating 5,740 mink from U.S fur farms.	
Ned Buyukmihci			United Kingdom	Doctor of veterinary medicine, founder of Association of Veterinarians for Animal Rights	
David Cantor	1954		United States	Founder and Executive Director of Responsible Policies for Animals, a unique national educational nonprofit organization based in Glenside, Pennsylvania.	
Joey Carbstrong	1986		Australia	Animal rights activist, veganism activist	
Paola Cavalieri	1950		Italy	Philosopher, campaigner for the Great Ape Project	
Margaret Cavendish, Duchess of Newcastle-upon-Tyne	1623–1673		United Kingdom	Writer, anti-vivisectionist	
Alan Clark	1928–1999		United Kingdom	Conservative Member of Parliament (1974–1992 and 1997–1999), historian, diarist	
Stephen R. L. Clark	1945		United Kingdom	Professor of philosophy at the University of Liverpool (1984–2009), author of The Moral Status of Animals (1977)	
Jean Clemens	1880–1909		United States	Daughter of Mark Twain	
Frances Power Cobbe	1822–1904		United Kingdom	Founder of the National Anti-Vivisection Society and the British Union for the Abolition of Vivisection	
Alasdair Cochrane	1978		United Kingdom	Political theorist based at the University of Sheffield; author of An Introduction to Animals and Political Theory and Animal Rights without Liberation	
Sue Coe	1951		United Kingdom	Artist, illustrator, author of Cruel: Bearing Witness to Animal Exploitation (2012)	
J. M. Coetzee	1940		South Africa	Novelist, recipient of the 2003 Nobel Prize in Literature, author of The Lives of Animals (1999)	
Priscilla Cohn	1933–2019		United States	Professor Emeritus of Philosophy at Pennsylvania State University, associate director of the Oxford Centre for Animal Ethics	
Jake Conroy	1976		United States	Member of SHAC7, animal rights activist	
Rod Coronado	1966		United States	Animal rights activist, formerly for the ALF, Earth First!, and ELF	
James Cromwell	1940		United States	Actor, played the farmer in Babe (1995)	
Karen Davis	1944–2023		United States	President of United Poultry Concerns, author of The Holocaust and the Henmaid's Tale (2005)	
John DeBacker	1993		United States	Vice President of Long Island Cat/Kitten Solution (LICKS)	
David DeGrazia	1962		United States	Professor of Philosophy at George Washington University, author of Taking Animals Seriously (1996)	
Chris DeRose	1948		United States	Founder of Last Chance for Animals	
Rukmini Devi	1904–1986		India	Dancer, founder of the Animal Welfare Board of India	
Nina Douglas-Hamilton, Duchess of Hamilton	1878–1951		United Kingdom	Co-founder of the Animal Defence and Anti-Vivisection Society	
Hugh Dowding, 1st Baron Dowding	1882–1970		United Kingdom	Commander of RAF Fighter Command, president of the National Anti-Vivisection Society	
Muriel Dowding, Baroness Dowding	1908–1981		United Kingdom	Founder of Beauty Without Cruelty	
Alice Drakoules	1850–1933		United Kingdom	Lifelong supporter and treasurer of Humanitarian League et al.	
Joan Dunayer			United States	Author of Animal Equality (2001) and Speciesism (2004)	
Lawrence Finsen			United States	Professor of philosophy at University of Redlands, co-author of The Animal Rights Movement in America (1994)	
Dian Fossey	1932–1985		United States	Primatologist, conservationist, advocate for mountain gorillas	
Roger Fouts	1943		United States	Primate researcher known for his work with Washoe the chimpanzee, adviser to the Oxford Centre for Animal Ethics	
Gary L. Francione	1954		United States	Distinguished Professor of Law and Nicholas deB. Katzenbach Scholar of Law & Philosophy at Rutgers School of Law–Newark, leading abolitionist, author of Animals, Property, and the Law (2005)	
Bruce Friedrich	1969		United States	Executive Director, The Good Food Institute	
Birutė Galdikas	1946		Canada	Primatologist, conservationist, expert on orangutans	
Maneka Gandhi	1956		India	Politician, founder of People for Animals	
Robert Garner	1960		United Kingdom	Professor of political theory at the University of Leicester; co-author of The Animal Rights Debate: Abolition or Regulation? (2010)	
Juliet Gellatley			United Kingdom	Founder and director of Viva!	
Tal Gilboa	1978		Israel	Founder of the Israeli Animal Liberation Front	
Dick Goddard	1931–2020		United States	Television meteorologist, animal advocate. Ohio 131st General Assembly–House Bill 60 (Dick Goddard's Law) was passed, which is named after him.	
Antoine Goetschel	1958		Switzerland	Lawyer, animal advocate for the canton of Zurich	
Lewis Gompertz	c. 1783–1861		United Kingdom	Author, Moral Inquiries on the Situation of Man and of Brutes (1824), founder Animals' Friend Society for the Prevention of Cruelty to Animals	
Jane Goodall	1934–2025		United Kingdom	Founder, Jane Goodall Institute, co-founder with Marc Bekoff of Ethologists for the Ethical Treatment of Animals	
Brigitte Gothière	1973		France	Director and spokesman for the animal rights group L214, which she co-founded with Sébastien Arsac	
Celia Hammond	1941		United Kingdom	Former model, founder of the Celia Hammond Animal Trust	
Stevan Harnad	1945		Hungary	Cognitive Sciences, Université du Québec à Montreal	
Alex Hershaft	1934		United States	Founder of Farm Animal Rights Movement and the Chairman of the U.S. Animal Rights National Conference	
Barry Horne	1952–2001		United Kingdom	Animal rights activist, hunger striker	
Oscar Horta	1974		Spain	Animal activist and moral philosopher who is currently a professor at the University of Santiago de Compostela (USC) and one of the co-founders of the organization Animal Ethics	
Wayne Hsiung	1980		United States	Lawyer, open rescue activist, co-founder of Direct Action Everywhere	
Harish Iyer	1979		India	Animal, LGBTIQ and Child Rights Activist	
V. R. Krishna Iyer	1915–2014		India	Former judge of the Supreme Court of India	
pattrice jones	1961		United States	Writer, educator, activist, co-founder of VINE Sanctuary	
Melanie Joy	1966		United States	Social psychologist and vegan activist, primarily notable for promulgating the term carnism	
Pedro Kaiten Piquero	1976		Spain	Classical pianist, translator, Buddhist Zen teacher, vegan activist	
Roberta Kalechofsky	1931–2022		United States	Writer, author of Animal Suffering and the Holocaust: The Problem with Comparisons (2003)	
Shannon Keith			United States	Animal rights lawyer, director of Behind the Mask (2006)	
Lisa Kemmerer			United States	Philosopher-activist, author, and educator	
Marti Kheel	1948–2011		United States	Ecofeminist writer, founder of Feminists for Animal Rights	
Anna Kingsford	1846–1888		United Kingdom	Physician, anti-vivisectionist, author of The Perfect Way in Diet (1881)	
Niko Koffeman	1958		Netherlands	Senator, Party for the Animals	
Christine Korsgaard	1952		United States	Arthur Kingsley Porter Professor of Philosophy at Harvard University, author of Fellow Creatures (2018)	
Tiphaine Lagarde	1982		France	Activist and co-founder of French antispeciesist association "269 Libération animale"	
Dennis Landgraf	2001		Germany	Politician, chair of the Human Environment Animal Protection Party.	
Carla Lane	1928–2016		United Kingdom	Television scriptwriter, ran Animaline animal sanctuary	
Gill Langley	1952		United Kingdom	Scientist, campaigner against the use of animals in research	
Charlotte Laws	1960		United States	Author, TV Host and Animal rights activist	
Ronnie Lee	1951		United Kingdom	Founder of the Animal Liberation Front	
Tobias Leenaert	1973		Belgium	Vegan activist, speaker, author of How to Create a Vegan World: a Pragmatic Approach, and blog The Vegan Strategist, co-founder of the Center for Effective Vegan Advocacy (CEVA) and ProVeg International	
Lizzy Lind af Hageby	1878–1963		Sweden	Founder of the Animal Defence and Anti-Vivisection Society, known for the Brown Dog affair	
Bob Linden			United States	Host of Go Vegan Radio	
Ludvig Lindström	1975		Sweden	Animal rights activist, founder of Global Happiness Organization	
Andrew Linzey	1951		England	Theologian, founder of the Oxford Centre for Animal Ethics	
Howard Lyman	1938		United States	Writer and activist, author of Mad Cowboy	
Dan Lyons			United Kingdom	CEO, Centre for Animals and Social Justice	
Jo-Anne McArthur	1976		Canada	Photographer, founder of the We Animals project and subject of The Ghosts in Our Machine	
Linda McCartney	1941–1998		United States	Photographer, musician, founder of Linda McCartney Foods	
Paul McCartney	1942		England	Musician, campaigner for People for the Ethical Treatment of Animals	
Colin McGinn	1950		England	Philosopher	
Charles R. Magel	1920–2014		United States	Professor emeritus of Philosophy and Ethics at Moorhead State University, animal rights activist and bibliographer	
Bill Maher	1956		United States	Comedian, board director of People for the Ethical Treatment of Animals	
Keith Mann			England	Animal rights activist, author of From Dusk 'til Dawn: An Insider's View of the Growth of the Animal Liberation Movement (2007)	
Jeffrey Moussaieff Masson	1941		United States	Former psychoanalyst, author of When Elephants Weep (1995)	
Dan Mathews	1964		United States	Senior Vice-President of People for the Ethical Treatment of Animals	
Gauri Maulekhi			India	Animal rights activist, Member Secretary People for Animals Uttarakhand, Trustee People for Animals, Consultant Humane Society International, Trustee People for Animals India	
Shirley McGreal	1934–2021		England	Animal welfare worker, founder of International Primate Protection League	
Mary Midgley	1919–2018		England	Senior Lecturer in Philosophy at Newcastle University (retired), author of Animals And Why They Matter (1983)	
Heather Mills	1968		United Kingdom	Campaigner for Viva!	
Moby	1965		United States	Musician, DJ, released Animal Rights (1996)	
Shaun Monson	1958		United States	Director of Earthlings (2005)	
J. Howard Moore	1862–1916		United States	Zoologist, philosopher, educator, social reformer, and author of The Universal Kinship (1906)	
José Ferrater Mora	1912–1991		Spain	Philosopher, honoured by the Ferrater Mora Oxford Centre for Animal Ethics	
Morrissey	1959		England	Musician	
Jesús Mosterín	1941–2017		Spain	Professor of Logic and Philosophy of Science at the University of Barcelona, honorary president of the Spanish Great Ape Project	
Ingrid Newkirk	1949		United Kingdom	Co-founder and President of People for the Ethical Treatment of Animals	
David Nibert	1953		United States	Abolitionist, Professor of Sociology at Wittenberg University	
Heather Nicholson	1967		United Kingdom	Co-founder of the Consort beagles, Hillgrove cats, and SHAC campaigns	
Jack Norris	1967		United States	Co-founder and executive director of Vegan Outreach, vegan, author of Vitamin B12: Are You Getting It? and Staying Healthy On Plant-Based Diets, Animal Rights Hall of Fame member	
Martha Nussbaum	1947		United States	Ernst Freund Distinguished Service Professor of Law and Ethics at the University of Chicago	
Natasja Oerlemans	1969		Netherlands	Politician, Party for the Animals	
David Olivier	1956		France	Philosopher and antispeciesist activist, founder of the journal Les Cahiers antispécistes	
Esther Ouwehand	1976		Netherlands	Member of Parliament, Party for the Animals	
Kelly Overton			United States	Executive Director of People Protecting Animals & Their Habitats	
Alex Pacheco	1958		United States	Co-founder of People for the Ethical Treatment of Animals	
Colleen Patrick-Goudreau	1970		United States	Author, Animal Advocate, Podcaster	
David Pearce	1959		United Kingdom	Philosopher, vegan and animal activist	
Jill Phipps	1964–1995		England	Animal rights activist, campaigner against live export	
Joaquin Phoenix	1974		Puerto Rico (United States)	Actor, animal rights activist, narrator of Earthlings (2005) and Dominion (2018)	
James Rachels	1941–2003		United States	Philosopher	
Tom Regan	1938–2017		United States	Professor emeritus of philosophy at North Carolina State University, author of The Case for Animal Rights (1983)	
Qiu Renzong	c. 1933		China	Bioethicist	
Dorothy Burney Richards	1894–1985		United States	Founder of Beaversprite, director of Defenders of Wildlife 1948–1976	
Nathaniel Peabody Rogers	1794–1846		United States	Abolitionist writer	
Bernard Rollin	1943–2021		United States	Professor of philosophy, animal sciences, and biomedical sciences at Colorado State University	
Craig Rosebraugh	1972		United States	Writer, environmentalist, animal rights activist	
Zoe Rosenberg	2002		United States	Animal sanctuary founder, animal rights activist	
Mark Rowlands	1962		Wales	Professor of Philosophy at the University of Miami, author of The Philosopher and the Wolf (2008)	
Regan Russell	1955–2020		Canada	The second Canadian to be struck by a pig hauling driver; she was killed on scene while attending an animal vigil through Toronto Pig Save	
Richard D. Ryder	1940		England	Psychologist, coined the term "speciesism" in 1970	
Henry Stephens Salt	1851–1939		England	Civil-rights campaigner, author of Animals' Rights: Considered in Relation to Social Progress (1892)	
Becky Sandstedt	c. 1960		United States	Animal rights activist, former investigator for Farm Sanctuary	
Steve F. Sapontzis	1945		United States	Professor emeritus of philosophy at California State University, East Bay, author of Morals, Reason, and Animals (1987)	
Anuradha Sawhney			India	Head of Indian operations for People for the Ethical Treatment of Animals	
Jérôme Segal	1970		France-Austria	Essayist, historian and author of Animal radical: Histoire et sociologie de l'antispécisme ("Animal radical: The history and sociology of antispeciesism")	
Rakesh Shukla	1971		India	Runs a dog home in Bengaluru; formerly a software entrepreneur	
Isaac Bashevis Singer	1902–1991		Poland	Winner of the 1978 Nobel Prize in Literature	
Peter Singer	1946		Australia	Philosopher, author of Animal Liberation (1975)	
Willie Smits	1957		Netherlands	Conservationist, founder of the Borneo Orangutan Survival Foundation	
Amy Soranno	c. 1993		Canada	Animal rights activist in British Columbia	
Henry Spira	1927–1998		United States	Animal rights activist, founder of Animal Rights International	
Kim Stallwood	1955		England	Animal rights activist, European director of the Animals and Society Institute, former national director of People for the Ethical Treatment of Animals (1987–1992), campaigns officer for the British Union for the Abolition of Vivisection (1981–1985), and national organizer for Compassion in World Farming (1976–1978), for which he remains a consultant. Founder of the Animal Rights Network (ARN), the world's largest library on animal rights, which became the Animals and Society Institute. Author of Growl: Life Lessons, Hard Truths, and Bold Strategies from an Animal Advocate. Lantern Books, 2013.	
Gary Steiner			United States	John Howard Harris Professor of Philosophy at Bucknell University	
William O. Stephens	1962		United States	Professor Emeritus of Philosophy at Creighton University	
Pelle Strindlund	1971		Sweden	Writer, founding member of the Rescue Service	
Cass Sunstein	1954		United States	Professor of Law at Harvard Law School, Administrator of the White House Office of Information and Regulatory Affairs	
David Sztybel	1967		Canada	Philosopher, writer	
Sunaura Taylor	1982		United States	Artist and writer	
Marianne Thieme	1972		Netherlands	Member of Parliament, Party for the Animals	
Darren Thurston	c. 1970		Canada	Animal rights activist	
Bob and Jenna Torres			United States	Writers, animal rights and vegan activists	
Tokugawa Tsunayoshi	1646–1709		Japan	The fifth shōgun of the Tokugawa dynasty of Japan, institutor of animal protection laws in 1695	
Andrew Tyler	1946–2017		United Kingdom	Director of Animal Aid	
Jerry Vlasak	1958		United States	Physician, Animal Liberation Press Office spokesperson	
John Vyvyan	1908–1975		England	Writer, author of The Dark Face of Science (1971)	
Alice Walker	1944		United States	Writer	
Donald Watson	1910–2005		England	Founder of the British Vegan Society	
Robin Webb	1945		England	Spokesperson for the British Animal Liberation Press Office	
Betty White	1922–2021		United States	Actress, author, comedian and animal rights activist	
Caroline Earle White	1833–1916		United States	Co-founder of the Pennsylvania Society for the Prevention of Cruelty to Animals, founder of the American Anti-Vivisection Society	
Liz White	c. 1950		Canada	Leader of the Animal Alliance Environment Voters Party of Canada	
Steven M. Wise	1950–2024		United States	Law professor, author of Rattling the Case: Toward Legal Rights for Animals (2000)	
Ursula Wolf	1951		Germany	Philosopher, author of Das Tier in der Moral (1990)	
Philip Wollen	1950		India	Australian philanthropist, environmentalist and animal rights activist	
Gretchen Wyler	1932–2007		United States	Actress, dancer, animal rights activist, and founder of the Genesis Awards for producing outstanding works which raise public awareness of animal issues	
Jon Wynne-Tyson	1924–2020		England	Founder of Centaur Press, author of The Extended Circle: A Commonplace Book of Animal Rights (1985)	
Roger Yates	1957		England	Sociologist, co-founder of Vegan Ireland: The Vegan Society of Ireland	
Peter Daniel Young			United States	Animal rights activist	
Gary Yourofsky	1970		United States	Animal rights activist and lecturer	
Benjamin Zephaniah	1958–2023		England	Rastafari poet, honorary patron of The Vegan Society	
Dina Zulfikar	1962		Egypt	Film distributor, animal rights activist, co-founder of SPARE Animal Welfare Society, member of Animal welfare and rights in the Netherlands	

== See also ==
- Animal rights
- Animal welfare
- List of vegans
- List of vegetarians
- List of peace activists
- List of animal rights groups
- List of animal advocacy parties
