= Roberto Torres =

Roberto Torres may refer to:

- Roberto Torres (musician) (born 1940), Cuban musician
- Roberto Torres (cyclist) (born 1964), Spanish former cyclist
- Roberto Torres (footballer, born 1972), Paraguayan football manager and former footballer
- Roberto Torres (footballer, born 1989), Spanish footballer
- Roberto Torres (author, born 1979), Puerto Rican author
- Roberto Torres (politician) (1938–2021), Brazilian politician

== See also ==
- Robert Torres
- Roberto Marrufo Torres (born 1949), Mexican politician
