= John Vivian =

John Vivian (or John Vyvyan) may refer to:

== Politicians ==
- John Vivian (died 1691), MP for Mitchell
- John Vivian (died 1577), MP for Helston
- John Charles Vivian (1887–1964), United States attorney, journalist, governor of Colorado
- John Vivian (Liberal politician) (1818–1879), English Liberal politician
- John Henry Vivian (1785–1855), Welsh industrialist and politician of Cornish extraction
- John Ennis Vivian, British member of parliament for Truro

== Others ==
- John Vivian (historian) (died 1771), Regius Professor of Modern History at Oxford, 1768–1771
- John Vivian (1750–1826), Welsh industrialist of Cornish extraction
- John Vivian, 4th Baron Swansea (1925–2005), British peer, sports shooter and lobbyist
- John Lambrick Vivian (1830–1896), genealogist and historian
- Jack Vivian (1941–2021), Canadian ice hockey player and coach, and college football player
- John Vivyan (1915–1983), American stage and television actor
- John Vyvyan (1908–1975), writer on animal rights
- Johnny Vyvyan (John Vyvyan, 1924–1984), Australian-born actor, appeared in Hancock's Half Hour and other British series

== See also ==
- John Vivian Dacie (1912–2005), British haematologist
