= Robert Torres =

Robert Torres may refer to:

- Bob Torres, professor of sociology at St. Lawrence University, author of books about animal rights and veganism
- Robert Torres (administrator), American administrator in Pennsylvania
- Robert Torres (judge), Guamanian judge
- Robert Torres (politician) (1938–2021), Brazilian politician

== See also ==
- Roberto Torres
