= Jérôme Segal =

French-Austrian essayist, historian, and journalist (born 1970)

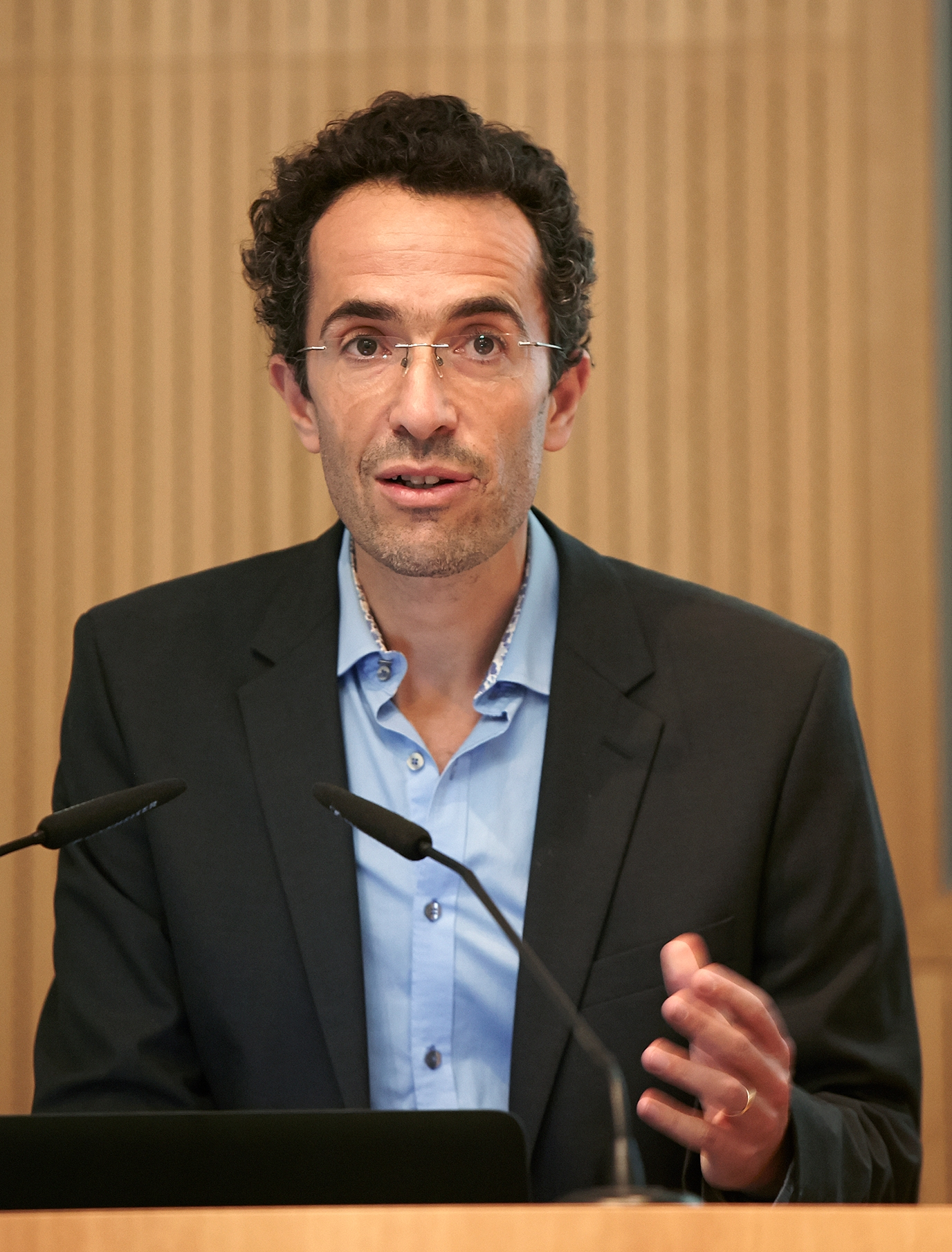
- Segal in 2015
- Born: 26 December 1970 (age 55); France
- Occupations: Essayist; historian; lecturer; researcher; journalist
- Website: jerome-segal.eu

Jérôme Segal (born 26 December 1970) is a French-Austrian essayist, historian, lecturer, researcher and journalist. He has lectured at Sorbonne University and worked as a researcher and journalist in Vienna. His writing has covered the history of science, Jewishness, animal rights, veganism, antispeciesism, racism, secularism, and circumcision.

== Education and academic career ==
Segal was born in France in 1970. He obtained an engineering degree from the École centrale de Lyon in 1993. He later studied the history of science, completing a DEA and then a doctorate between Lyon and Berlin from 1993 to 1998. His doctoral work examined the history of information theory in the second half of the 20th century. He continued this work as a postdoctoral researcher at the Max Planck Institute for the History of Science. In 2000, he returned to France to work as a lecturer in the history of science and epistemology at IUFM in Paris, and as a researcher at the Cavaillès Center of the École normale supérieure.

Segal moved to Austria in 2004 as an academic and scientific cooperation attaché at the French Embassy in Vienna. He later worked in Vienna as a researcher in social sciences at the Interdisciplinary Center for Comparative Research in Social Sciences from 2008 to 2011, as coordinator of the doctoral college in history and philosophy of science at the University of Vienna from 2011 to 2014, and as an associate researcher at the Ludwig Boltzmann Institute for Social History from 2014 to 2016. In 2016, he returned to a lecturer post at Sorbonne University, within INSPE Paris.

== Work ==
=== Writing and journalism ===
Segal has described himself as an "interventionist" and a "pathological writer". Since 2008, he has maintained the blog Le petit flambeau - L'Autriche vue par un universitaire français ("The Little Torch - Austria as Seen by a French Academic"), which has covered Austrian politics, racism and secularism. He has written articles and reviews for Nonfiction.fr on similar subjects, as well as on animal rights and marathon running. He has also written for the antispeciesist journal L'Amorce. Segal has worked as a French media correspondent in Austria and has written articles since 2002.

=== Activism ===
Segal has opposed racism and supported refugees in Austria. After encountering the situation of Roma in Europe in Montreuil in 2001, he became involved with the subject as an activist and writer. He published two articles on Roma in Les Temps modernes.

Segal is a vegan and an advocate of animal rights and antispeciesism. Several of his books and articles discuss animal rights. He is also a member in Austria of the Team Vegan sports association. In France, he was a candidate for the Animalist Party in the 2019 European election.

Segal has also written against the circumcision of minors, arguing for children's bodily integrity. He discussed the subject historically in Athée et Juif, and in newspaper and journal articles.

=== Jewishness ===
Segal's paternal grandfather fled Austria for France in May 1938, joined the French Foreign Legion, and later entered the French Resistance, where he met Segal's grandmother. Segal has written on Jewish identity and has described himself as an "atheist Jew". From 2006 to 2011, he worked on the organization of the Vienna International Jewish Film Festival while also working on the Euro-Festival project, which studied festivals as sites of debate and identity construction.

=== Marathon running ===
Segal is a marathon and ultramarathon runner. Since 2003, he has reported running four to five marathons or ultramarathons per year in 15 countries.

== Publications ==
In Le zéro et le un, Segal examined the formation of information theory in the context of the Cold War, including the roles of industry, military research and university research in the development of early computer networks. Christian Lapeyroux wrote in Le Monde diplomatique that the book showed "how much the theory of information could have been the object of ideological, political and social stakes" in its early years.

Animal radical is an essay on the history and sociology of antispeciesism. The book discusses the development of antispeciesist thought from ancient Greece to Israel, and includes sections on anarchism. Reviews noted that, although Segal is vegan and antispeciesist, the book also discusses neo-pagan groups and political violence connected with parts of the movement.

=== Books ===
- Pourquoi courir ? 20 raisons de pratiquer la course à pied, Les Perséides, 2024.
- Veganwashing. L'instrumentalisation politique du véganisme, Lux, 2024.
- Radikales Tierrecht. Zehn Fragen zum Antispeziesismus, translated into German by Brita Pohl, turia + kant, 2024.
- C'est à ce prix qu'ils comprirent, Les Perséides, 2023.
- Tous véganes ? Manifeste pour un véganisme éclairé, Yves Michel, 2021.
- Dix questions sur l'antispécisme. Comprendre la cause animale, Libertalia, 2021.
- L'armoire, Valensin – David Reinharc, 2020.
- Animal radical: Histoire et sociologie de l'antispécisme, Lux, 2020.
- Vegan: Mehr denn je!, Konturen, 2020.
- Wie ein roter Faden, Konturen, 2019.
- Judentum: über die Religion hinaus, Konturen, 2017.
- Athée et Juif: Fécondité d'un paradoxe apparent, Editions Matériologiques, 2016.
- Le Zéro et le Un, Histoire de la notion scientifique d'information au XXe siècle, Editions Matériologiques, 2011.

=== Chapters ===
- "Gastronomie végétalienne" and "Action directe", in Renan Larue (ed.), La pensée végane: 50 regards sur la question animale, Presses Universitaires de France, 2020.
- "Autriche: Quand le nationalisme issu de l'extrême droite devient majoritaire", in Dominique Vidal (ed.), Les Nationalistes à l'assaut de l'Europe, Demopolis, 2020.
- "Cannes: 'A French International Festival'", with C. Blumauer, in Gerard Delanty, Liana Giorgi and Monica Sassatelli (eds.), Festivals and the Cultural Public Sphere, Routledge, 2011.
- "L'or noir contre l'étoile jaune, mobilités particulières des Juifs de Galicie ayant investi dans le pétrole", in Jacques Le Rider and Heinz Raschel (eds.), La Galicie au temps des Habsbourg (1772–1918): Histoire, société, cultures en contact, Presses Universitaires François Rabelais, 2010.

== See also ==
- List of animal rights advocates
