= Animal Rights Without Liberation =

2012 book by Alasdair Cochrane

- Author: Alasdair Cochrane
- Language: English
- Series: Critical Perspectives on Animals (edited by Gary Francione and Gary Steiner)
- Subjects: Animal rights, animal welfare
- Publisher: Columbia University Press
- Publication date: 2012
- Media type: Print (Hardcover and Paperback)
- Pages: 258
- ISBN: 978-0231158275

Animal Rights Without Liberation: Applied Ethics and Human Obligations is a 2012 book by the British political theorist Alasdair Cochrane, in which it is argued that animal rights philosophy can be decoupled from animal liberation philosophy by the adoption of the interest-based rights approach. Cochrane, arguing that there is no reason that (nonhuman) animals should be excluded from justice, adopts Joseph Raz's account of interest rights and extends it to include animals. He argues that sentient animals possess a right not to be made to suffer and a right not to be killed, but not a right to freedom. The book's chapters apply Cochrane's account to a number of interactions between humans and animals; first animal experimentation, then animal agriculture, the genetic engineering of animals, the use of animals in entertainment and sport, the relationship of animals to environmental practices and the use of animals in cultural practices.

The book is based upon Cochrane's doctoral thesis, which was completed at the London School of Economics, and builds upon subjects he had discussed in previous publications, including his first book. An Introduction to Animals and Political Theory. It was published by Columbia University Press as the second book in their series Critical Perspectives on Animals, edited by Gary Francione and Gary Steiner. Critics from a variety of backgrounds responded positively to the book, focussing on how Cochrane had found a middle ground between traditional animal rights philosophy and utilitarianism.

== Background ==
Animal Rights Without Liberation is based upon Cochrane's doctoral thesis, completed at the London School of Economics (LSE) under the supervision of Cécile Fabre, with Paul Kelly acting as an advisor. The thesis was examined by Anne Phillips and Albert Weale, the former of whom suggested the title which was used for the book. The arguments in the book differ from the arguments in the thesis, however, and in preparing the manuscript for publication, Cochrane drew upon the advice of a number of academics, especially Robert Garner.

In addition to presenting ideas used in the book at meetings of the Political Theory Group at LSE, Cochrane published an article entitled "Animal interests and animal experiments: An interest-based approach" in the journal Res Publica in 2006. This article won the journal's second annual Postgraduate Essay Prize, and formed the basis of the third chapter of Animal Rights Without Liberation. Cochrane continued to work on questions of animal rights after the completion of his doctorate, publishing articles on the subject in Utilitas and Political Studies in 2009, the latter of which provoked responses from Garner in 2011 and the philosopher John Hadley in 2013. Cochrane published his first book, An Introduction to Animals and Political Theory, through Palgrave Macmillan in 2010, after having moved to the Department of Politics at Sheffield University.

Animal Rights Without Liberation was published by Columbia University Press, as part of the series Critical Perspectives on Animals: Theory, Culture, Science, and Law. The series, edited by the legal scholar Gary Francione and the philosopher Gary Steiner, aims to give direction to the emerging interdisciplinary research in animal studies. Animal Rights Without Liberation was the second book published as a part of the series, after Francione and Garner's 2010 The Animal Rights Debate: Abolition or Regulation? It was published in August 2012 in a variety of formats.

== The interest-based rights approach ==
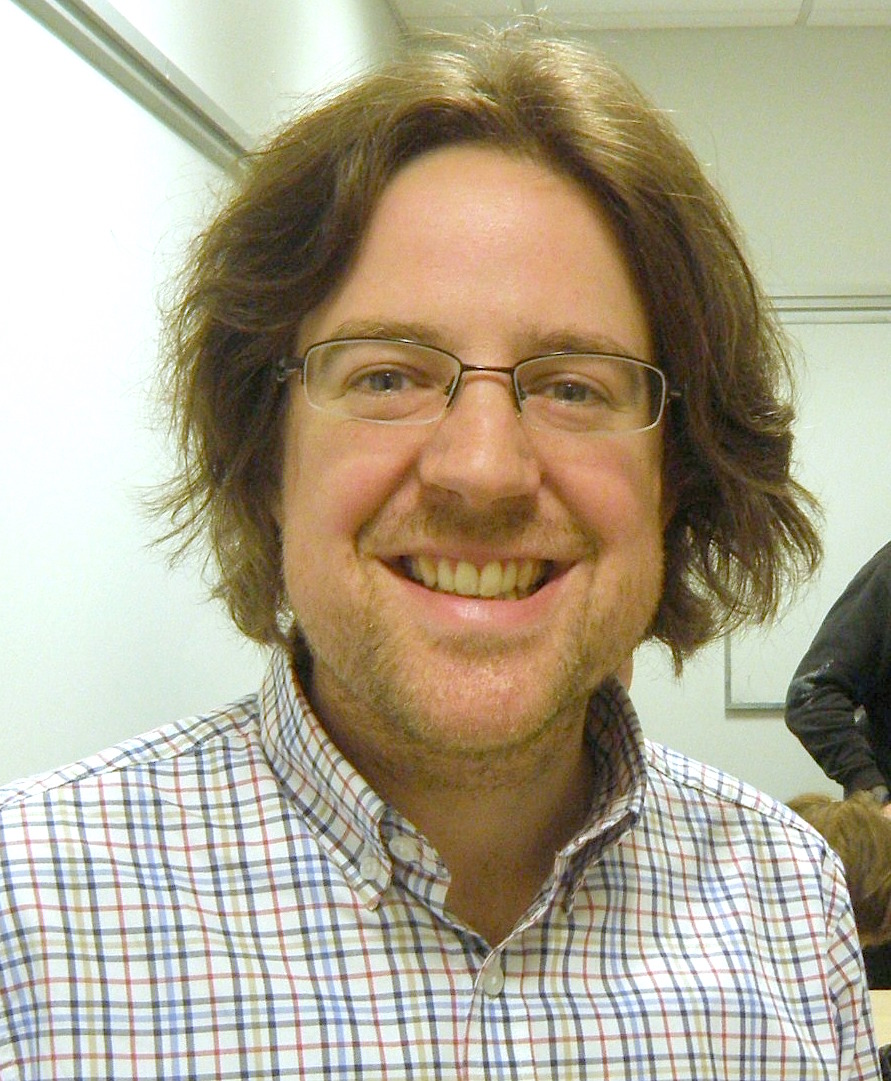
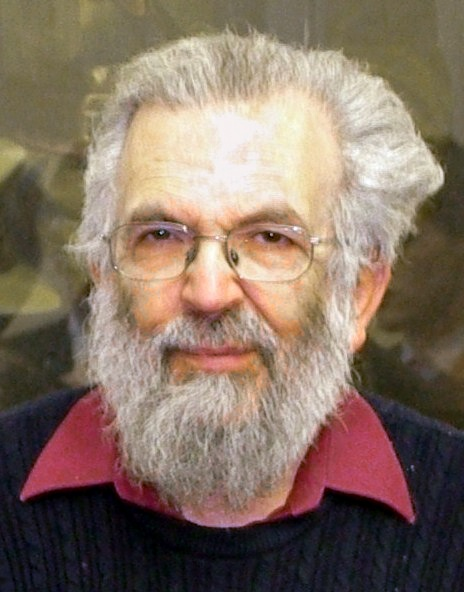
Cochrane (left, 2013) bases his account of interest-based rights on the work of Joseph Raz (right, 2009).

Cochrane's "interest-based rights approach" is the method utilised in the book to examine various ways in which animals are used by humans. Rights set limits on what can be done, even in the pursuit of aggregative well-being. The animal rights outlined by philosopher Tom Regan are based on the "inherent value" of individual animals (see intrinsic value). For Cochrane and other critics, this basis can seem "mysterious". Instead, Cochrane suggests that rights should be grounded in interests, and follows legal philosopher Joseph Raz's formulation that

'X has a right' if and only if X can have rights and, other things being equal, an aspect of X's well-being (his interest) is a sufficient reason for holding some other person(s) to be under a duty.

Cochrane draws out several aspects of this account, which serves as the basis of the analysis in Animal Rights Without Liberation. First, interests must be "sufficient to give grounds for holding another to be under a duty". Judging this entails considering the strength of an interest as well as "all other considerations"; so, for example, while individuals may have a very strong interest in free expression, but, "all things considered", this need not protect slander. The greater interest of the victim of slander can outweigh the interest in free expression, and so context is important. This is the difference between prima facie rights and concrete rights. The former exist on an abstract level outside of particular circumstances. Prima facie rights can translate into concrete rights when considered in particular situations but do not always, as the free expression example illustrates. The account is for moral rights, and Cochrane's normative claims are intended to form part of a "democratic underlaboring", informing and persuading political communities.

The strength of an interest is determined by a consideration of the value of something to an individual (though this is not understood purely subjectively) and the relationship between the individual at this time and the individual when he or she has the interest satisfied (see personal identity). Cochrane argues that those beings who lack personhood, including many nonhuman animals and some humans, do not have an interest in liberty or not being used by others, and so have no prima facie right to freedom. They do, however, possess significant interests in not being made to suffer and in not being killed, and so have a prima facie right not to be made to suffer and a prima facie right not to be killed.

== Synopsis ==
=== Methodology ===
Animal Rights Without Liberation seeks to decouple animal rights from animal liberation. For Cochrane, of central importance is the question of sentience, understood as "the capacity for phenomenal consciousness". No position is taken on precisely how many animals are sentient, but, Cochrane argues, it is clear that at least some nonhuman animals are. Sentience alone does not afford moral status, but sentience implies the capacity for well-being; sentient beings have lives that can go better or worse for them. Enlightenment philosopher Immanuel Kant argued that personhood is required for moral value, but Cochrane observes that there may be nonhuman animals who could be considered persons. In any case, it is argued that there are good reasons not to agree with Kant, and Cochrane concludes that there is no reason to limit the possession of moral status to humans. What needs to be considered is not whether anything is owed to animals, but what is owed to them. Following a paper on animal rights by political philosopher Joel Feinberg, Cochrane suggests that animals possess rights on account of their interests. Cochrane then deals with four possible objections. Interest rights are defended against the claim that moral agency is a prerequisite of rights-possession, against the demand that rights be derived from social relations, against the suggestion, from R. G. Frey, that animals do not possess interests, and against the idea that inanimate entities and plants may possess interests.

At this point, Cochrane has completed the first two steps introducing his interest-based rights approach; the third is outlining the approach itself as the appropriate means of understanding obligations to animals in political communities. Utilitarianism, as advocated by Peter Singer, is rejected because of its failure to take individuals seriously enough; Cochrane desires an account which takes well-being seriously but is not purely aggregative. This, he suggests, is one based on interest rights. After explicating the details of his interest-based rights approach, Cochrane defends it against the charge that it would result in an unworkably large number of rights, and that rights approaches are too rationalistic.

=== Application ===
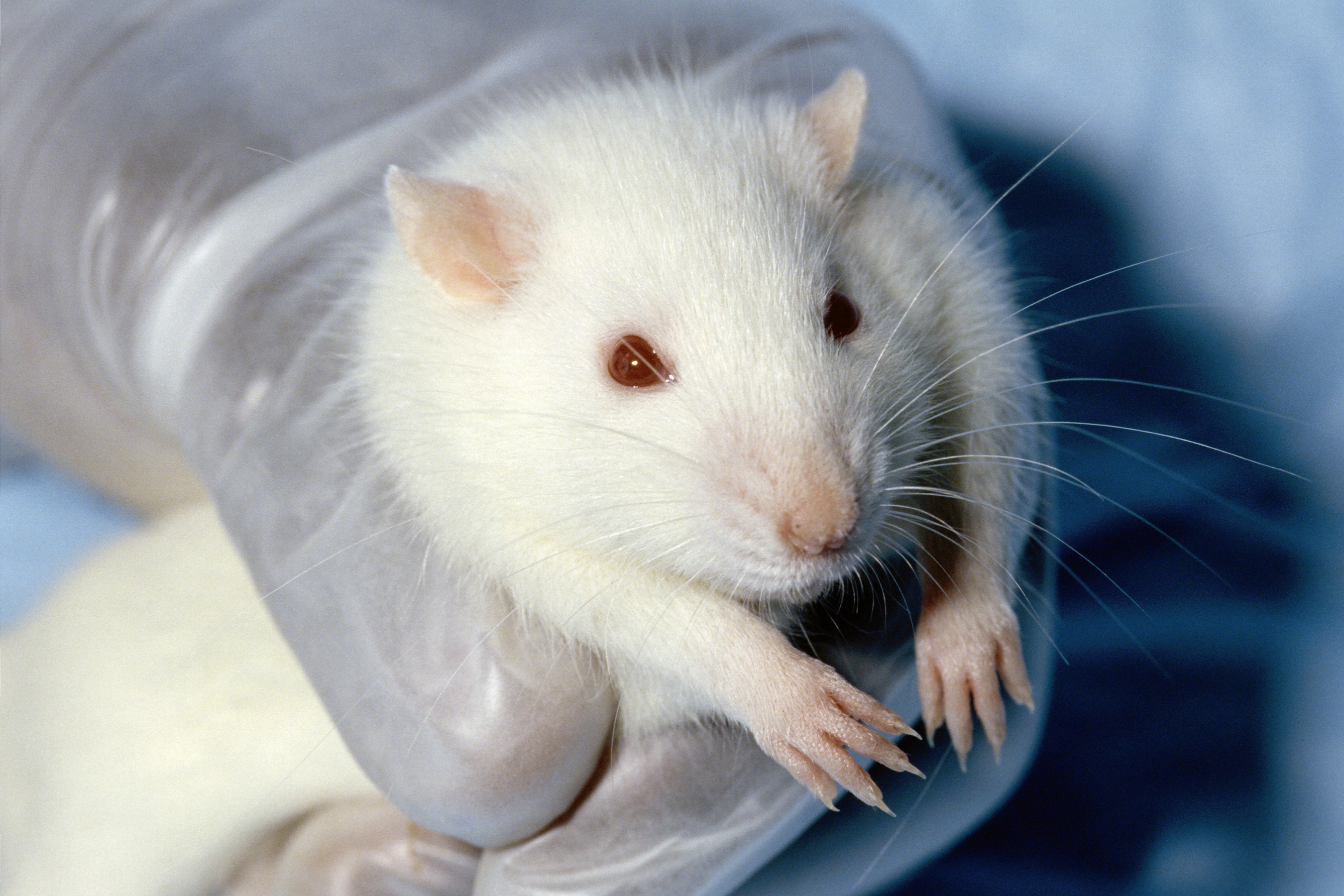
Cochrane argues that while animals have no right against being used in painless experiments, they do have a right not to be killed or made to suffer in experiments.

Having outlined his methodological approach, Cochrane goes on to apply his theory to a number of ways that animals are used by society. First, Cochrane considers animal experimentation, arguing that "animal experiments that result in pain or death are morally illegitimate, while painless experiments in which the animal does not die are permissible, all else being equal." Cochrane discusses how to judge the strength of an interest, and then considers the strength of animals' interests in not being subjected to painful experimentation. He considers three reasons the interest may not be sufficient to ground a right, and rejects them all; that the benefits of animal testing outweigh the suffering, that humans owe more to members of their own species than to members of others (see speciesism) and that human lives are objectively more valuable than the lives of other animals. Cochrane concludes that animals have a concrete right to not be subjected to painful experiments. He next considers animals' interests in not being killed, concluding that they "have an interest in continued life so that they may have more pleasant experiences and greater overall well-being in their lives", but that this interest is weaker than the corresponding interest possessed by human persons. If deadly experimentation on nonhuman non-persons is permitted, then consistency demands that it also be permitted on human non-persons, such as babies or individuals with certain cognitive disabilities. Like most others, Cochrane is unwilling to allow this possibility, and so claims that animals have a right not to be used in deadly experiments. However, he argues that animals have neither an interest in negative or positive freedom, and, like animals, human non-persons also lack this interest; therefore, neither have a prima facie right not to be used, provided said use respects the rights they do possess.

The second considered application is animal agriculture. Cochrane argues that animals possess concrete rights not to be made to suffer or be killed while being raised for food. The book argues that factory farming inflicts suffering upon the animals used, and this suffering outweighs the cost to humans of not using the method. Killing animals for their flesh is also challenged, and objections that this infringes on human liberty, that many humans would lose their jobs and that flesh-consumption is necessary for human health are all considered and rejected. Milk and egg production may be permissible under certain circumstances, provided animals are not killed or made to suffer, and, equally, animal corpses could be used provided that the animals have died naturally. Three counter arguments are considered. First, Cochrane contends that the fact farmed animals would not exist were it not for the human desire for their flesh is irrelevant: it is not clear that creating animals is good for them, and, even if it is, doing a good thing for an animal will not justify subsequently harming them, just as it would not in a human case. Second, Cochrane considers the fact that some animals are killed by nonhuman predators. He rejects Regan's claim that intervention is not required when killers are not moral agents and the consequentialist claim that interference will do more harm than good, instead suggesting that nonhuman predators need to kill to survive, but humans do not. Third, he considers the fact that animals are killed in the harvesting process. These animals, he suggests, are killed for human survival, but as fewer are killed than would be killed were humans eating meat, they do not possess a concrete right to life. Despite this, political communities must take steps to ensure that fewer animals are killed in harvest.

After looking at agriculture, Cochrane considers the relationship between animals and genetic engineering. The question of whether an animal has a right not to be genetically engineered, he suggests, makes no sense, as live animals are not engineered, and embryos have no interests, so cannot have rights. Instead, Cochrane considers whether animals have a right not to have been engineered, arguing that it is not the case that they always do, and that if "genetic engineering gives the animals lives with opportunities for well-being that are similar to or better than ordinary members of their species, then it is ordinarily permissible." Cochrane then addresses four reasons to oppose this claim; first, the notion that genetic engineering instrumentalizes animals, second, the idea that genetic engineering is repugnant, third, that genetic engineering reveals a flaw in character (see virtue ethics) and fourth, that genetic engineering denies the dignity of animals. Cochrane finds none of these arguments reason to abandon the principle. Cochrane considers whether animals may ever have a right not to have been engineered. He argues that animals have a right not to be engineered such that they have lives not worth living. He then rejects some reasons for believing that animals have a right not to be engineered with diseases or disabilities, but concludes that they do, as engineered animals have an interest "in having been engineered with sufficient opportunities for well-being", an interest which is strong enough to ground a concrete right. However, Cochrane argues that he is not advocating perfectionism, as he is concerned not with equal capacities between members of a species, but equal opportunities for well-being. Finally, Cochrane considers the possibility of engineering nonsentient, non-conscious livestock, arguing that, ordinarily, there is no wrong in engineering nonconscious entities.

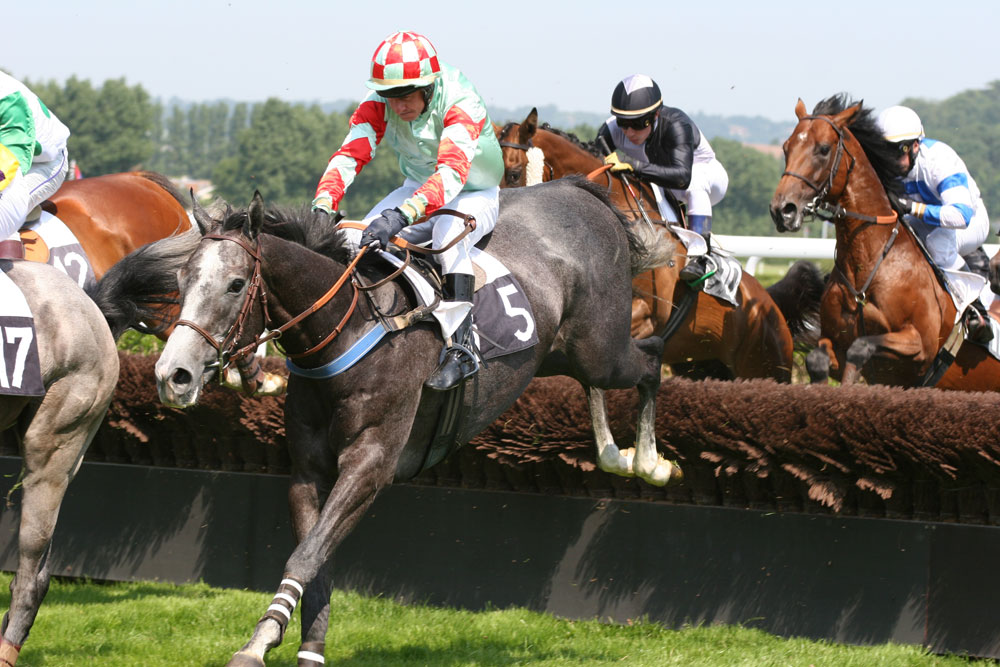
Cochrane condemns current practices in horse racing. He notes that the UK industry spends only £250,000 a year caring for retired animals, a sum he calls "pathetic", given the horses' interest in life and avoiding suffering and the profits the industry commands.

Chapter six addresses the use of animals in entertainment. Cochrane does not oppose the practice of pet-keeping, and accepts that humans do have an interest in being able to keep pets, but that this interest is not so strong that it can be satisfied at any cost. He argues that pet-keeping should be regulated far more than it is, perhaps through the need for a license, the granting of which would be dependent on individuals proving their ability to care for the animal's well-being. Cochrane is open to euthanizing pets, but only in cases when medical care could not give them a chance at further good experiences. In these cases, providing medical care would be necessary (pet insurance could be a requirement for a license). Neutering pets is argued to be neither a violation of their rights nor a requirement, but anyone who does not have their pets neutered would be required to ensure the wellbeing of any offspring. The same requirements as were established in the chapter on genetic engineering are applied to animal breeding, and Cochrane accepts that this may lead to the extinction of certain breeds. Concerning zoos and circuses, Cochrane argues that animals do not possess a right not to be kept or displayed, but they do possess a right not to be made to suffer. This imposes limitations on the kinds of animals which can be kept (for instance, large animals could not realistically be kept by traveling circuses), the conditions in which they are kept, and the nature of their performances. Hunting, cockfighting, dogfighting, bear baiting and bullfighting are condemned, as is, after some consideration, fishing. Cochrane is potentially open to greyhound and horse racing, or equestrianism generally, but says that "the way that these sports are currently organized and practiced does involve the routine suffering and death of animals and ought to be condemned as such." Such practices include suffering caused during training and racing, and the killing of animals past their peak or who do not display the requisite skills. Before concluding the chapter, Cochrane considers, but rejects, three possible objections to any use of animals in entertainment: first, by appeal to a concept of dignity, which use of the animals undermines; second, an appeal to disrespect, whether or not harm is caused; and third, that the use of animals in entertainment implies ownership, and animals have a right not to be considered property.

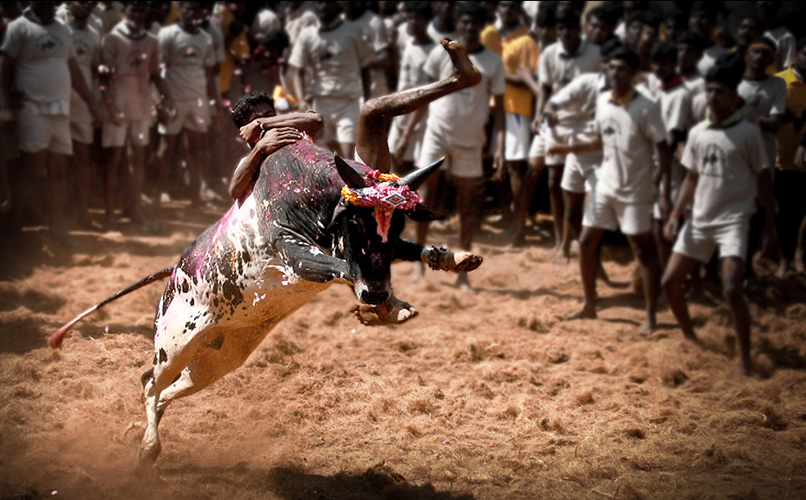
Cochrane argues that a human interest in culture cannot outweigh animal interests in not suffering or being killed, using jallikattu (pictured) as an example practice that cannot be justified.

In chapter seven, Cochrane approaches issues relating to animals and the environment. He first argues for the importance of this kind of analysis, before saying that, under the interest-based rights approach, non-conscious entities (including species, ecosystems and plants) cannot be understood to have rights; he then defends the necessity of consciousness for the possession of interests. Cochrane considers, but rejects, the land ethic of Aldo Leopold as a basis for the moral status of the environment, but instead defends the environment on welfare grounds. Though he rejects the notion that wild animals might own the land on which they live, Cochrane concludes that we have strict environmental obligations due to the rights and interests of sentient animals. Concerning endangered species, Cochrane rejects the notion of "superkilling" (that a special wrong is involved in wiping out a species) and the idea of "compensatory justice" (that more is owed to members of endangered species as a form of compensation). Instead, Cochrane argues that unconscious species may have contingent value, and members of rare conscious species may have a stronger right to life due to the interests of humans who will want to see them and the interests of other animals in their ecosystems. Cochrane then argues that animals possess a concrete right not to be killed in order to preserve a favoured ecosystem, whether because of overpopulation of the species or because species are nonnative. However, control by contraception is argued to be acceptable.

In the final chapter on the application of the interest-based rights approach, Cochrane analyses the use of animals in cultural practices, considering the importance of culture, religion and a concern about hypocrisy. Cochrane first looks at the possibility that humans have an interest in culture which outweighs certain interests of animals. He argues that it cannot be the case that culture can always outweigh other rights. He then argues the human interest culture cannot outweigh animal interests in not suffering, using jallikattu as his example, or outweigh animal interests in not being killed, even if this entails the destruction of cultures "defined entirely by the grave harm [they cause] to animals". The human interest in freedom of religion, Cochrane claims, will usually not require the violation of animal interests, but cites Santeria as a possible exception to this. Cochrane argues against the possibility that freedom of religion is a special interest and should always merit priority, and the idea that equal opportunity should entail religious freedom to harm animals. Finally, Cochrane considers hypocrisy; given that animals are harmed in many practices, there may be a problem in disallowing certain religious practices. However, this does not make the religious practices more permissible, and seems to presuppose that these other practices will not themselves face censure.

=== Conclusion ===
The aim of Animal Rights Without Liberation was to "decouple animal rights and animal liberation". Cochrane claims that not only is an alternative to the Regan/Singer dichotomy possible, but it is preferable. He argues that, though his theory would allow the use and ownership of animals in certain circumstances, the theory would nonetheless have "incredibly radical" consequences if applied. The book has aimed to persuade people of the importance of animal rights, and thus serve as "democratic underlabouring". This democratic underlabouring, Cochrane claims, is essential for the legitimacy of animal rights. Relatedly, Cochrane firmly rejects violent interventions on behalf of animals as counterproductive, immoral and illegitimate.

== Reviews ==
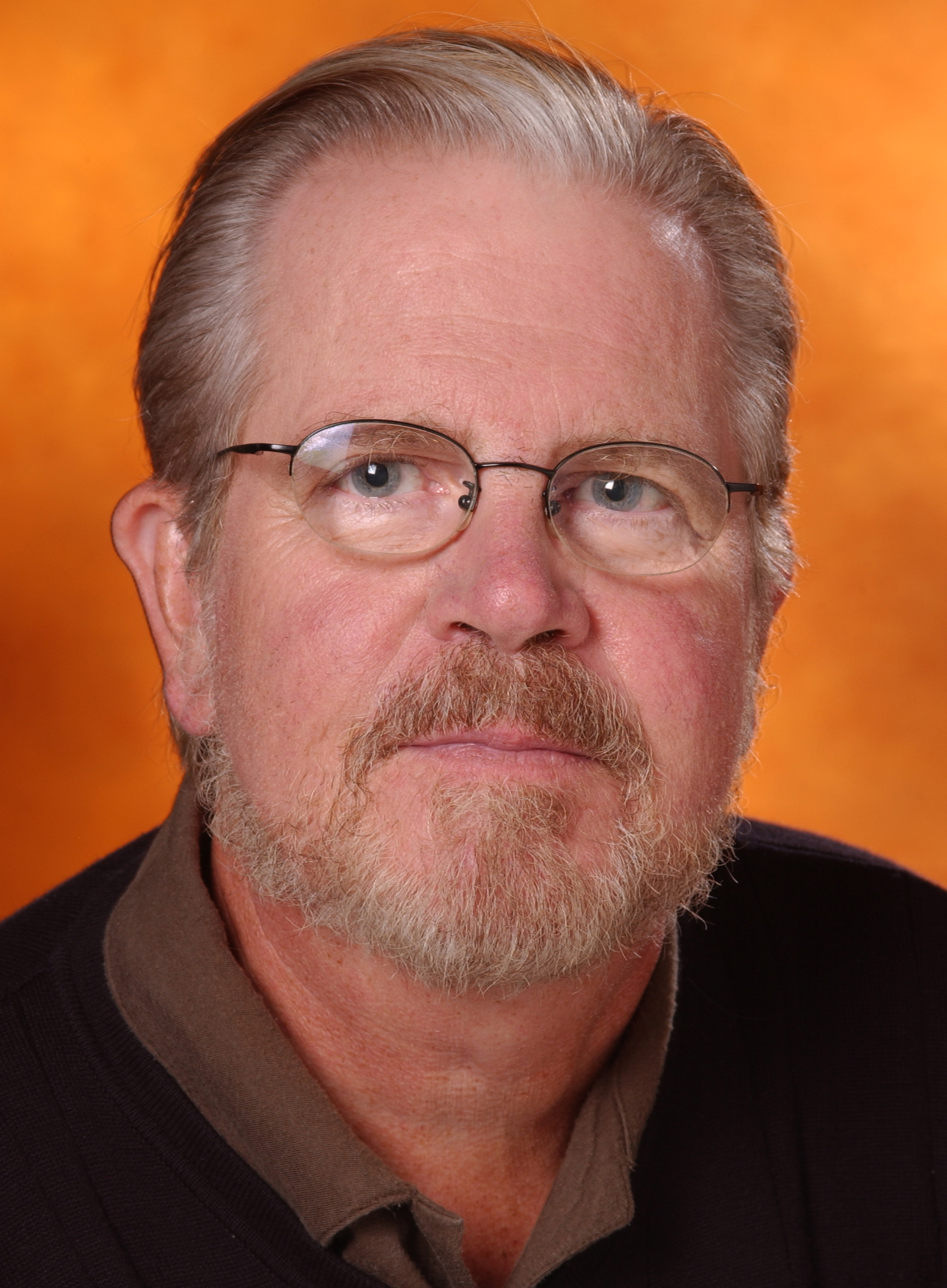
Many reviewers focussed on how the position of Animal Rights Without Liberation represented a middle ground between animal rights approaches (as advocated by Tom Regan)...

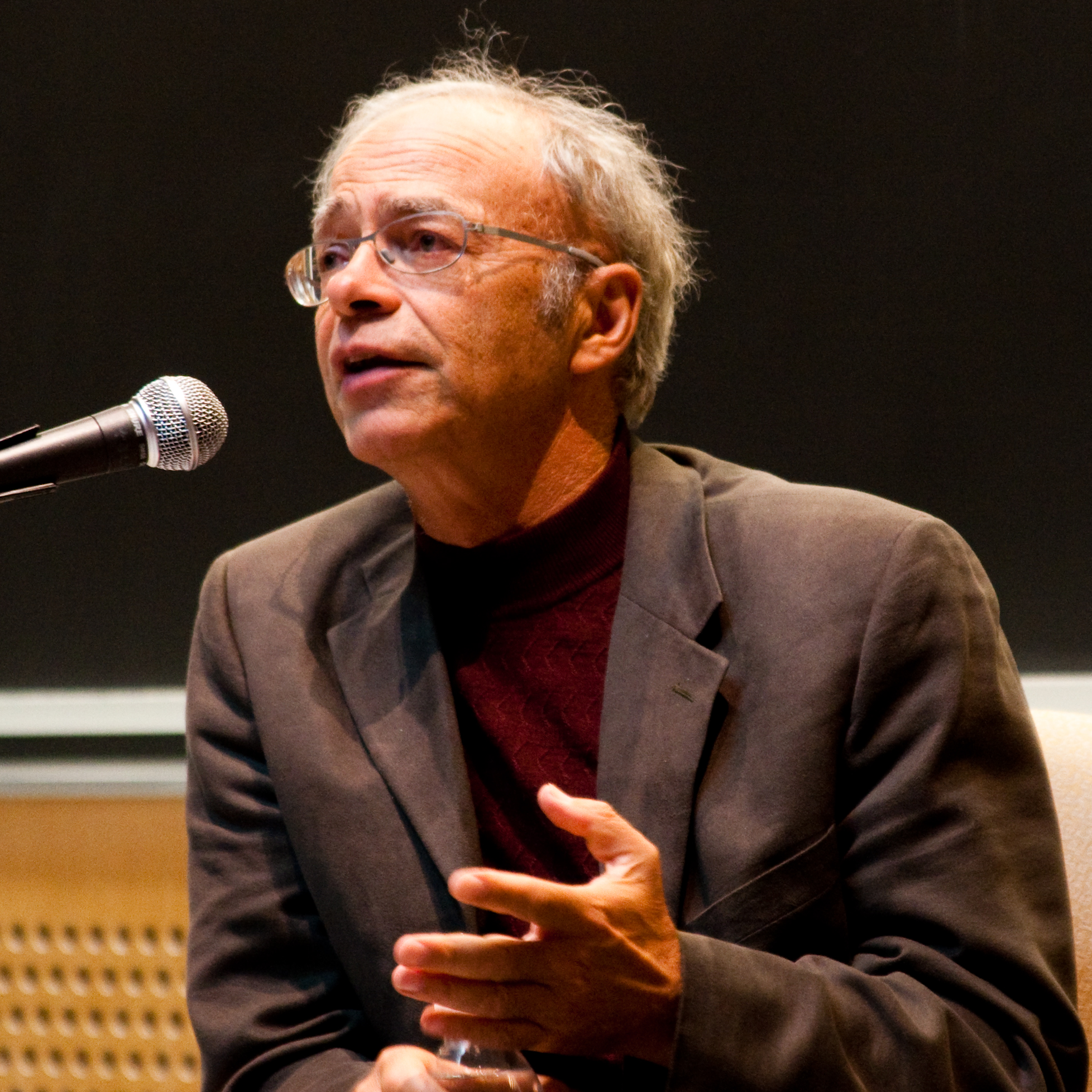
...and animal welfare approaches (as advocated by Peter Singer).

Animal Rights Without Liberation was reviewed by the philosophers Corinne Painter, Rainer Ebert and Eva Meijer for the Radical Philosophy Review, the Journal of Animal Ethics and Animals & Society respectively, while the sociologists Mark Suchyta and Luís Cordeiro Rodrigues reviewed the book for Between the Species and the Marx & Philosophy Review of Books respectively. The political historian Will Boisseau reviewed the work in the Political Studies Review, and other reviews were written by Hadley, published on the Global Policy website, the founder of Animal People Merritt Clifton for the Animal People website, and an unnamed reviewer for Internet Bookwatch.

Hadley found the most important contribution of the theoretical framework laid down in Animal Rights Without Liberation to be the application of a Razian framework of rights to animals, adding that "assuming that one takes philosophical reasoning seriously, there is little to take issue with in Cochrane's analysis". However, for Hadley, there is a fundamental tension in Cochrane's theory, as there is in most animal rights literature. In denying that animals possess the psychological capacities to value freedom, Cochrane undermines the challenge to orthodox rights theory that it is not only persons who should possess rights. For Hadley, "only theories that have no truck with commonsense intuitions at all, like Bentham's, are really in a position to place humans and animals on a genuinely equal moral plain. The rest, arguably, are more or less disguised versions of the person-centred orthodoxy masked by rhetorical appeals to cross-species equality." Hadley denies that this tension undermines Cochrane's overall argument, writing that it "ought to give no comfort to opponents of animal rights. [Cochrane's] reasoning, assuming you accept animals matter at all, is as uncontroversial as his writing is accessible."

Hadley closed his review by considering the book's middle ground between traditional rights theory and utilitarianism, writing that, for Cochrane

in line with orthodox animal rights theory, animals are owed some utility-trumping rights—a right not to suffer and a right not to be killed; but, in line with utilitarianism, [Cochrane] wants to promote well-being without giving animals a right to liberty in the sense of outright protection from ownership and use by humans. Cochrane thus successfully 'decouples' the rights-utilitarian dichotomy and locates his theory in the middle ground between the two. You might say he gives with one hand while taking away with the other.

Clifton and Ebert, too, focussed on Cochrane's attempt to find and conceptualise a middle ground between the work of Regan (who advocates animal rights) and Singer (who advocates animal welfare from a utilitarian perspective), and Meijer praised it for identifying a conceptual space between animal rights and animal liberation. Clifton suggested that Cochrane's thought is actually closer to Regan's. Boisseau, though, suggested that, given that Cochrane allows some use of animals in entertainment and genetic engineering, the arguments of Animal Rights Without Liberation may come across as "radically permissive" when compared with those of other animal rights positions. The permissibility of some forms of animal experimentation under Cochrane's account "may shock" supporters of approaches based upon Regan's philosophy. Ebert concluded that "the great accomplishment of Cochrane's book is to show that there is a coherent, intuitively plausible, and useful notion of animal rights that is firmly rooted in the tangible and avoids the unattractive absolutism of Regan-style rights views". Meijer felt that the book is strong on the application of Cochrane's account, but she expressed concern about Cochrane's rejection of liberty rights for animals, which, she noted, most approaches to animal rights allow. Cochrane's deploys, she noted, a narrow account of animal agency; "it is", she argued, "problematic to view humans as autonomous agents and other animals as nonautonomous others". Cochrane's view of animals as non-autonomous, she argued, is emphasised by the absence of an account of relationships and communication between humans and animals.

Ebert felt that the "rather disconcerting" element of Cochrane's thought concerning nonautonomous humans was dealt with too quickly in the book, saying that "controversy would be certain if infants or the seriously mentally disabled were regarded as property or put up for display in human zoos, regardless of how well they were taken care of. If we believe that human nonpersons have a right not to be treated in such a degrading manner, then so do nonhuman animal nonpersons." Boisseau, too, found the aspect of Cochrane's thought dealing with "people with mental disabilities" to be "objectionable".

Clifton approvingly quoted the arguments in Animal Rights Without Liberation concerning animals killed in crop harvest, and observed that, other than a hypothetical openness towards ethically produced eggs and dairy, Cochrane's arguments would seem to favour veganism over vegetarianism. Clifton also showed interest in Cochrane's arguments concerned pet-keeping, writing "Cochrane never mentions pit bulls, but his argument is in effect a case for prohibiting pit bull breeding: pit bulls have never been more than 5% of the U.S. dog population, but are 20% of the dogs impounded in cruelty and neglect cases." Boisseau worried that animal activists may find the imprecise positions of "animal rights" or "animal liberation" more useful than Cochrane's comparatively nuanced position, and questioned the extent to which political and legal change could be possible given continued use of animals.

The book was summarised in Internet Bookwatch as "[p]ragmatic, insightful, rational, iconoclastic, informed and informative". It was described as "thoughtful and thought-provoking, making it a welcome and highly recommended addition to personal and academic library Contemporary Ethics reference collections and supplemental reading lists." In addition to a quote from Internet Bookwatch, Columbia University Press advertised Animal Rights Without Liberation with quotes from several academics working in the area of animal ethics. Philosophers Peter Singer and Paula Casal praised work for exposing a false dichotomy of animal rights versus animal welfare, both seeing the work as an important contribution to the literature for this reason. Francione, an advocate for an animal rights approach which does mandate liberation, was quoted as saying that "It would be an understatement to say that I disagree with Cochrane but he does a fine job presenting the argument and his book will surely provoke debate and discussion."

== Legacy ==
In a quote used by Columbia University Press, Garner praised Animal Rights Without Liberation for being the first sustained attempt to use an interest-based theory of rights for animals, and the first to use such a theory to challenge animals' right to liberty. In his 2013 A Theory of Justice for Animals, Garner challenges Cochrane on his use of the argument from marginal cases. If animals are assumed to have an equal interest in life as typical humans because marginal humans are, then one could also assume animals to have an equal interest in liberty, because of the assumption of marginal humans' interest in liberty. Cochrane, however, denies that marginal humans are assumed to have a strong interest in liberty. The first part of the argument, Garner observes, assumes that marginal humans are considered to have an equal interest in (or an equal right to) life; this is a claim which Garner challenges, reaching what he considers a more nuanced position than Cochrane's. Nonetheless, the ideal theory which Garner endorses—the enhanced sentience position—is close to Cochrane's interest-based rights position. Garner himself identifies differences between his thought and Cochrane's in their respective use of the argument from marginal cases and the fact that Garner offers a nonideal theory, while Cochrane does not. Garner also questions the extent to which Cochrane is right that his reliance on interest rights is new, suggesting that Feinberg, James Rachels and Steve Sapontzis all used the language of interest rights. Garner adds that "what Cochrane does, unlike Sapontzis, is to draw what I think are the correct conclusions from the adoption of an interest-based theory of animal rights".

Garner has also criticised Cochrane's rejection of liberty rights for animals; others to challenge this include Hadley and the philosophers Andreas T. Schmidt, Valéry Giroux, and Jason Wyckoff. Cochrane has developed his account in subsequent work, tying his work to cosmopolitan theory in a 2013 paper and developing an account of labour rights for animals in a 2016 paper. As of 2016, Cochrane is working on a book on the topic of animal rights and global justice, covering questions of cross-border obligations to nonhuman animals and the idea of international politics taking the rights of all sentient beings seriously. The book is intended for 2017 or 2018 release.

A number of subsequent thinkers have deployed interest-based rights for animals, drawing upon Cochrane's work. Tony Milligan characterises the use of interest-based rights as a close-to-defining feature of the literature exploring the intersections of political theory and animal ethics; this literature has been variously referred to as the "political turn" in animal rights/animal ethics, "Animal Politics" and "animal political theory". Cochrane's work, especially Animal Rights Without Liberation, has been repeatedly identified as central to and paradigmatic of this literature.

== Formats ==
- Paperback: Cochrane, Alasdair (2012). Animal Rights Without Liberation. New York: Columbia University Press. ISBN 978-0-231-15827-5.
- Cloth/Hardback: Cochrane, Alasdair (2012). Animal Rights Without Liberation. New York: Columbia University Press. ISBN 978-0-231-15826-8.
- E-book: Cochrane, Alasdair (2012). Animal Rights Without Liberation. New York: Columbia University Press. ISBN 978-0-231-50443-0.
- Online: Cochrane, Alasdair (2012). Animal Rights Without Liberation. New York: Columbia University Press. doi:10.7312/coch15826.
