= Gauri Maulekhi =

Indian animal rights activist

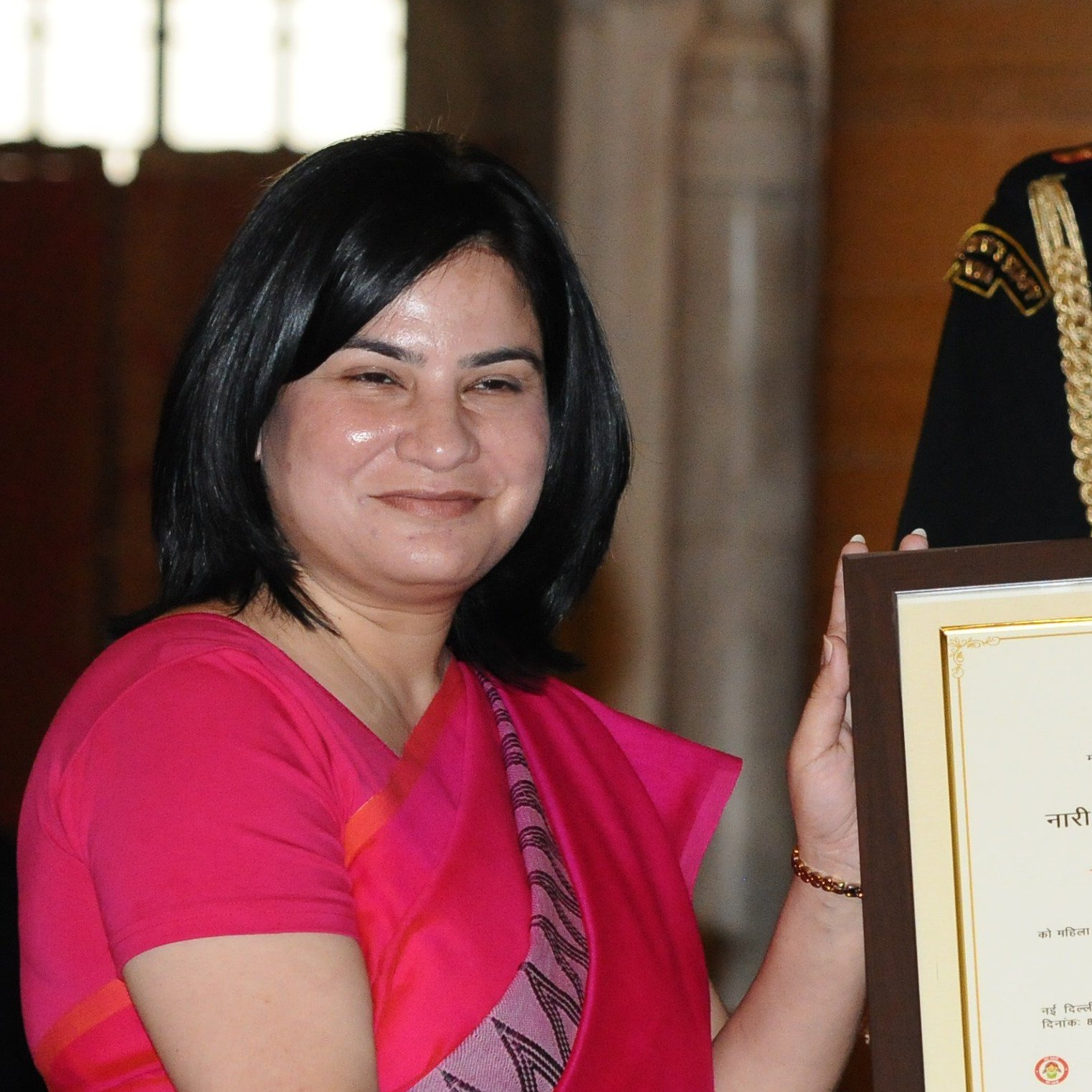
- Gauri Maulekhi, an Indian animal welfare activist, received the 2018 Nari Shakti Puraskar, the highest civilian award for women in India.
- Education: B.Com
- Alma mater: University of Lucknow
- Occupation: Animal welfare activist
- Organization: People for Animals
- Known for: Animal welfare activism, disaster management

Gauri Maulekhi is an animal welfare activist in India. She is the Trustee of People for Animals, India's largest animal welfare organization founded by Smt. Maneka Gandhi, Member of Parliament, Lok Sabha. A protege of Ms. Gandhi, she has led successful campaigns for animal rights, including campaign against the practice of sacrificial slaughtering of cattle.

== Background ==
Gauri Maulekhi started working for People For Animals in Lucknow in 1995 as a volunteer, where she played a vital role in setting up the first animal shelter in the city. She also helped raise funds for the shelter, conducted adoption programmes for rehabilitating abandoned dogs and facilitated the coordination of animal ambulance service for animals in distress. From 2004 to 2008, she worked closely with the Society for Prevention of Cruelty to Animals (SPCA) in Noida contributing to the organization's sheltering efforts. In 2008, she volunteered with Raahat, an animal welfare NGO in Dehradun. During this period, she actively engaged in fundraising efforts for the NGO. In 2012, she set up the Uttarakhand Chapter of People For Animals - People For Animals Uttarakhand.

Maulekhi is active internationally. She lobbied in Nepal to end the huge mass religious animal slaughter at Gadhimai festival. Back in India in 2013 there was a climate disaster when the North India floods were created by unusual torrential rain. Maulekhi helped evacuate more than 6,000 animals from the flooded Kedarnath region. Saving these animals influenced future national policy for dealing with disasters. The plans now incorporate a consideration of animal welfare. Maulekhi also helped the campaign to end the (illegal) wildlife trade at the Sonepur Animal Fair. These acts earned Maulekhi the Nari Shakti Puraskar (National Award).

In 2019 Maulekhi began a campaign to get the government to realise its past commitments to improve animal welfare. She wrote to each of India's states regarding a ten year old directive to form State Animal Welfare Boards. These boards were requested by the Supreme Court and although some were created, others were not. Those that were formed were there in name only as they lacked staff or a budget. In 2020 Maulekhi asked India's Supreme Court to issue a writ to require states to create State Animal Welfare Boards.

== Awards and honours ==
- 2013: Felicitated by Government of Uttarakhand for distinguished service in animal protection and disaster management during the Uttarakhand floods
- 2017: Lush Prize for contribution towards reducing unnecessary use of animals in laboratories
- 8 March 2018: Nari Shakti Puraskar, the highest civilian award for women in India.
- 2018: University of Lucknow's Distinguished Alumni Award for meritorious work in animal welfare
- 2018: Outstanding Animal Protection Award from the Humane Society International at Kansas City, USA

== See also ==
- List of animal rights advocates
- Animal Rights and Welfare in India
