= Martin Balluch =

Austrian philosopher and physicist

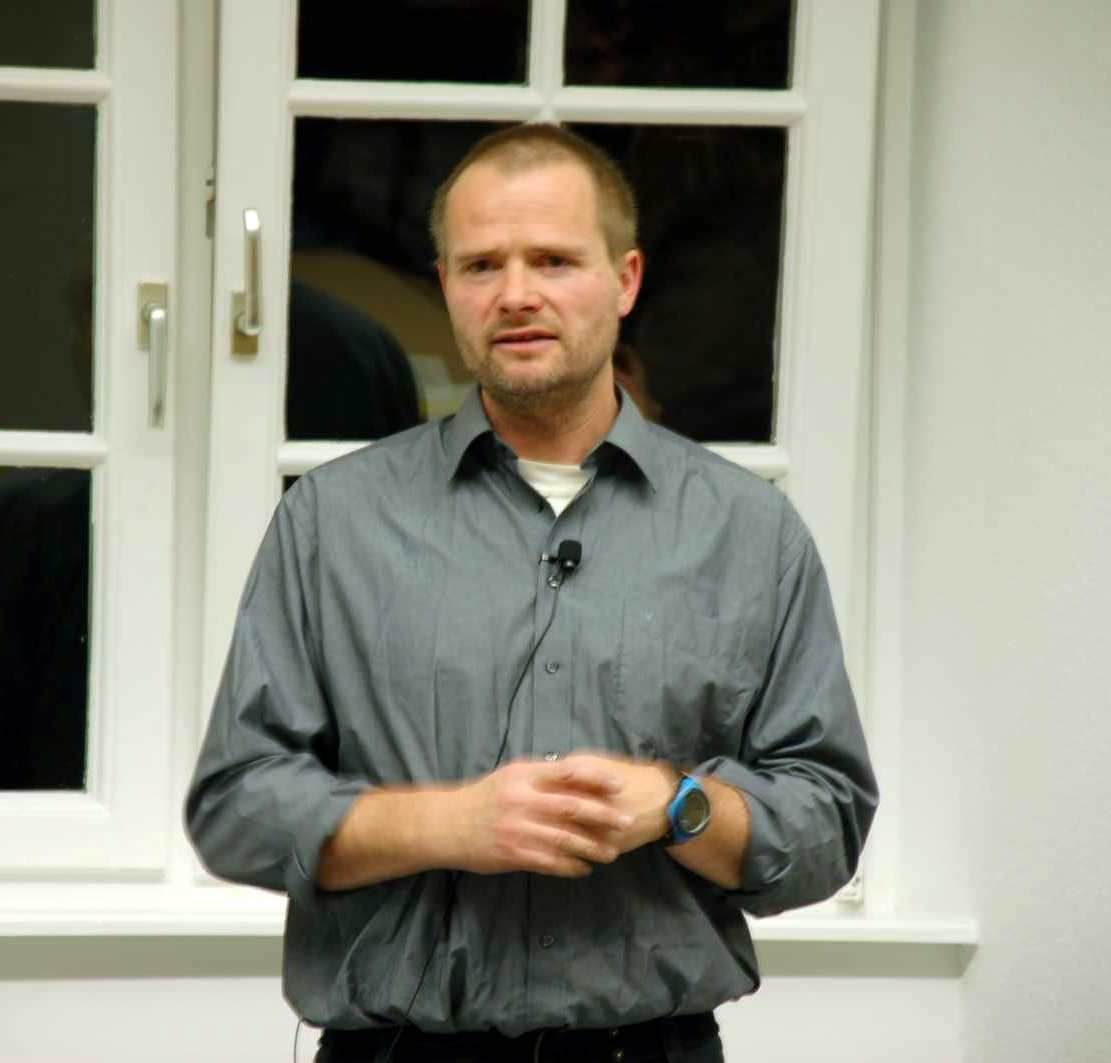
Martin Balluch

Martin Balluch (born 12 October 1964) is an Austrian physicist, philosopher, vegan and prominent animal rights activist. He co-founded the Austrian Vegan Society in 1999, and has been president of the Austrian Association Against Animal Factories since 2002. The philosopher Peter Singer has called Balluch "one of the foremost spokesmen in the worldwide animal rights movement for pursuing the nonviolent, democratic road to reform."

== Early life and career ==
Balluch was born in Vienna, Austria. He obtained diplomas in mathematics and astronomy from the University of Vienna in 1986 and 1987, and his PhD in physics from the University of Heidelberg in 1989. He worked for 12 years as a lecturer and researcher at the Universities of Vienna, Heidelberg, and Cambridge, before leaving academia in 1997 to become a full-time animal rights advocate.

== Animal rights advocacy ==
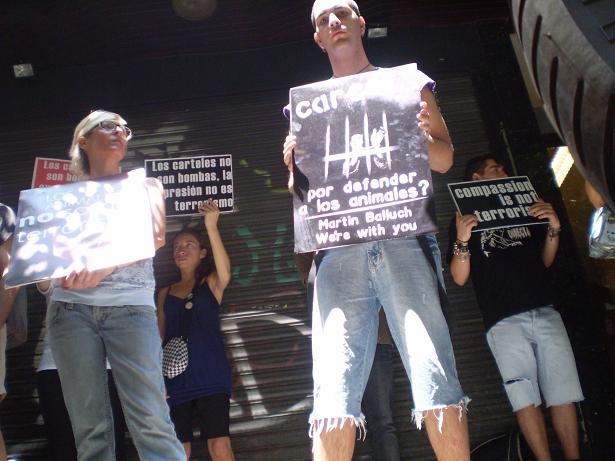
Activists protesting against the jailing of the Austrian animal rights advocates

Balluch became active within the animal rights movement in 1985, moving to full-time advocacy in 1997 while at Cambridge.

He was one of two protesters who abseiled down Great St Mary's Church in Cambridge in November 1998 in support of animal rights activist Barry Horne, who spent 68 days on hunger strike in an unsuccessful effort to have the government order a Royal Commission on animal testing.

In an article in Peter Singer's In Defense of Animals: The Second Wave, Balluch describes his activism in Austria, which he says has given Austria animal protection legislation that, he writes, is among the most advanced in the world. He attributes the effectiveness of the activism to a united front among animal advocacy groups, which are elsewhere often divided by ideology and arguments about tactics. The first Austrian animal rights conference was held in Vienna in 2002, leading to a united press conference, which, he writes, signaled the start of a campaign to change the law.

Balluch is notable for his role in persuading the Austrian parliament in 2004 to add a clause about non-human animals to the country's constitution, which now reads, "The state protects the life and well-being of animals in its responsibility for them as fellows of mankind. " He also helped to establish "animal solicitors" in each province, who are empowered by start court proceedings on behalf of animals, and he was prominent in the campaign to have chicken batteries outlawed, which resulted in their being declared illegal in Austria after 1 January 2009.

By 2006, there was a ban on battery farms for chickens; a ban on the trade of dogs and cats in pet stores; a ban on the public display of dogs and cats in order to sell them. It is against the law to kill any animal without good cause; kill shelters are outlawed. Each province must appoint an "animal solicitor" financed by the state. The solicitors may take action on behalf of any animal, and must be kept informed about trials involving animals. When police or prosecutors are made aware of breaches of animal legislation, they are now compelled by law to act. Every two years, the government must write a report on advances made in animal protection. An "animal protection committee" has been set up, with one member elected by animal advocacy groups. The use of wild animals in circuses is prohibited. And the following statement has been added to the constitution: "The state protects the life and well-being of animals due to the special responsibility of mankind with respect to animals as their fellows. "

He was invited to run as a Green Party candidate in September 2008.

On 21 May 2008, Balluch was one of 10 leaders of Austrian animal advocacy groups jailed without charge under a law aimed at organized crime. The court recommended that the activists be held until September of the same year. Balluch responded by launching a hunger strike, which led to his being artificially fed. He was released on 3 September 2008.

In February 2010, the state prosecution announced that enough evidence had been found to put 13 animal protection activists, including the ten who had spent three months in custody, on trial.

Four of the activists have released their charge sheets on the internet. The activists' supposed membership in a criminal organisation is deduced from an extensive list of expressed opinions and political activities, such as organising demonstrations and public conferences. After 14 months of trial at a cost of over €35, 000 in lawyer fees for each of the accused, a complete verdict of "not guilty" for all was handed out on 2 May 2011.

== See also ==
- List of animal rights advocates
- List of vegans
