= Andrew Tyler =

English animal rights activist and journalist

- Born: 8 September 1946; Hackney, London, England
- Died: 28 April 2017 (aged 70); Zurich, Switzerland
- Occupations: Animal rights activist, journalist
- Spouse: Sara Starkey (m. 1978)

Andrew Tyler (8 September 1946 – 28 April 2017) was an English animal rights activist and journalist. He was the director of the animal rights organisation Animal Aid, until 2016. As a journalist, he wrote for Drapers & Fashion Weekly, NME, Time Out, The Guardian and The Independent.

== Biography ==
Tyler was born on 8 September 1946, in Hackney, London. He grew up in a Jewish children's home from the ages of six to fourteen, when he left school and worked his way up to being a junior reporter at Drapers & Fashion Weekly. Tyler wrote for NME from 1973 to 1980, interviewing several famous musicians including, Bruce Springsteen, Stevie Wonder, Ray Davies, Leonard Cohen and John Lennon. In the early 1980s, he was news feature editor for Time Out. He joined Animal Aid in 1995, later becoming director.

Tyler married Sara Starkey in 1978, who had a son from a previous marriage.

Near the end of his life, Tyler suffered from a degenerative back condition and Parkinson's disease. He retired in 2016 and finished his memoir My Life As an Animal (2017). For the final six weeks of his life, he recorded a video diary, in which he advocated for allowing people to die with dignity. Tyler ended his life at the Dignitas clinic in Switzerland, on 28 April 2017.

== Selected publications ==
=== Articles ===
- "Porton Down", Vegan Views, Autumn 2001.
- A National disgrace?, The Guardian, 3 April 2004.
- with Peter Webbon. "Should the Grand National be axed for being too cruel?", The Guardian, 4 May 2006.
- Don't be blinkered to the cruelty of racing, The Guardian, 18 November 2005.
- "An Act that has failed to protect animals", The Independent, 17 April 2006.
- "Xenotransplantation", Genetic Futures News, undated, retrieved 18 September 2006.

=== Books ===
- Big Pig (Animal Aid, 2005)
- My Life As an Animal (2017)

== See also ==
- List of animal rights advocates
