= Anuradha Sawhney =

Anuradha Sawhney is an Indian animal rights activist. She was the chief functionary and the head of Indian operations for People for the Ethical Treatment of Animals (PETA) and was the editor of the Indian edition of the animal rights magazine Animal Times.

== Anuradha's work with PETA ==
She took care of the media relations and management, including all communications related to Animal Rights and Welfare in India, both within the country and to global press. She was also in charge of legal, research, and reporting of animal rights and welfare in India.

== Early life ==
Anuradha grew up in Bokaro, where she attended school at the St Xavier's convent as well as at Sophia College, Bombay. While there she fed the various hungry animals she encountered. She also cared for various neglected and mistreated animals including a calf that had been left to die on a roadside.

== Further work with PETA India ==
She takes every opportunity to speak about animal rights. Her work with PETA widely varies from working with such celebrities as Raveena Tandon, Madhavan, Celina Jaitley, and Shilpa Shetty, to going undercover to investigate cruelty and rescuing abused animals, to appearing in newspapers around the globe. Named as one of Femina magazine's "50 Most Powerful Women", she has received many honours, including a 2009 Women's Achiever award.

=== Veganism ===
She was not raised as a vegan, but she became one once she realised how animals suffer in the food industry. She believes that "Billions of intensively-raised animals will end up on dinner tables this year alone. They are made of flesh, blood and bone and can feel love, happiness, loneliness and fear just like dogs and cats. Yet because they were born chickens or pigs or cows, these animals are denied everything that is natural to them. Chickens spend their brief lives in crowded conditions; many of them are so cramped that they can't even turn around or spread a wing. Most do not get a breath of fresh air until they are prodded and crammed onto lorries for a nightmarish ride to the abattoir. Hung upside-down, their throats are sliced open, often while they are still alive."

She was part of PETA India's vegetarian campaign, which teaches about the benefits of a vegan lifestyle.

=== Campaigns ===
- To document the cruelty of poultry farms, PETA India conducted an undercover investigation into the husbandry, slaughter and transport conditions of chickens. A report of their findings was sent to every Animal Husbandry Department in the country to ensure that appropriate steps are taken to maintain humane standards at poultry farms.
- A similar undercover investigation by PETA India into the dairy industry revealed a shocking story of filth and abuse where animals are treated like milk-producing machines and denied their most basic desires. Cows were found chained by their necks in narrow stalls, unable to stretch or move. Newborn calves were separated from their mothers and tied by their necks with ropes so short that they often strangle themselves in desperate attempts to reach their mothers.
- PETA India also supports an international campaign protesting Kentucky Fried Chicken's (KFC) treatment of animals. Various KFC outlets in India were protested, with protesters demanding that KFC adopt even the minimal humane standards recommended by their own animal welfare committee.
- PETA India's efforts to promote vegetarianism have gotten quite a boost from celebrity supporters. Public figures of note - Aditi Govitrikar, Anil Kumble, Mahima Chaudhary, Devang Patel, Madhavan - willing crammed themselves in a cage to show people how chickens suffer and Channel V mascot Professor Simpoo.

== Achievements ==
Under Anuradha's leadership, PETA India emerged as the foremost animal rights organisation in India, that has also been recognised by the Limca Book of Records in 2 consecutive editions. PETA was invited to join the Food and Agricultural Divisional Committee of the BIS, PETA has framed 11 vivisection standards for the BIS and the transport and circus standards framed by PETA have already been approved and passed by the BIS, PETA joined the slaughterhouse sectional committee and submitted a revised slaughterhouse code, PETA has suggested amendments to the Prevention of Cruelty to Animals act and rules and is now a special Invitee to the Legal Sub Committee of the Animal Welfare Board of India. She has actively participated to fight for freeing of animals from the Indian leather industry (which led to an international boycott of Indian leather by over 40 companies), milk industry and chicken industry. PETA India has rescue of over 100 animals, including lions and tigers amongst others, from circuses and zoos across the country and their placement in rescue centres. She has been supportive of the banning the entry of ? into the city of Mumbai and its neighbouring districts with 16 other states following suit and passing similar legislation.

When she has been the Chief Functionary, PETA India has received the following awards

- Red Swastik Award 2008
- Salaam Award 2008
- Nakul Award 2008
- IVC Award 2008
- Chakrvyuh award by Lalarajpatrai Institute of Management 2007
- Exuberance award 2006 by SIES College
- Indira Award 2005

The following are awards that she has personally received for her achievements in the animal rights movement.

- Women's achievement award, 2009
- Ranked as one of India's 50 most powerful women by Femina magazine
- Regarded as the leading authority by national and international media where animal rights and welfare issues for India are concerned.
- Co-opted as a member of the Animal Welfare Board of India for Maharashtra.

== See also ==
- List of animal rights advocates
