= Ludvig Lindström =

Swedish activist

Ludvig Andreas Lindström (born 22 September 1975 in Huskvarna, Sweden) is a Swedish animal rights activist, and the founder and President of Global Happiness Organization.

Lindström has been a volunteer in the American animal rights organization People for the Ethical Treatment of Animals (PETA) and the Swedish animal rights organization Animal Rights Sweden.

Lindstrom is perhaps best known for his campaigns, and for his signum "naked animal activism". Among other things, he has gone on hunger strike in a small cage at the Sergel Square in Stockholm in protest against the closure of the Animal Welfare Agency (which evaluated, enforced and developed legislation aimed at improving the welfare of nonhuman animals); has gone “on loan” at the Malmö public library in an attempt to decrease prejudice against animal rights activists; and has staged numerous “meat tray” demonstrations (naked humans in big meat trays to protest against the meat industry) throughout the Nordic region.

Lindström advocates the development of in vitro meat to replace the exploitation of sentient intact animals. In 2008 he participated in the world’s first international in vitro meat symposium in Ås outside Oslo; and in 2010 he put together an exhibition about in vitro meat at the Malmö Museum.

In 2009 Lindström was elected Europe's sexiest vegetarian, a competition organized by PETA.

Lindstrom is also involved in Swedish refugee politics. In 2008, he launched the network Vellinge Citizens for Refugees to promote a warmer welcome for refugees in the Vellinge Municipality, the first such organization in the municipally of Vellinge.

== See also ==
- List of animal rights advocates
