= Bob Linden =

American radio personality

- Born: New York City, United States
- Education: Queens College, City University of New York
- Occupations: Radio host, producer, event organizer, promoter
- Years active: 2000–present
- Known for: Creator and host of Go Vegan Radio
- Website: GoVeganRadio.com

Bob Linden is the creator, executive producer and host of Go Vegan Radio, a one-hour talk radio program dedicated to topics including veganism, animal rights and environmentalism. Linden is also an events organizer and professional promoter. Linden played a major role in the conception, development and promotion of Vegan Earth Day Events, San Diego Fall-Fest, which he has also emceed. He has served as Media Coordinator for the Farm Animal Rights Movement (FARM) and the Great American Meatout.

== Go Vegan Radio ==
Linden created "Go Vegan with Bob Linden" in the Spring of 2000 out of his concern for local community advocacy and his increasing involvement in the animal rights movement. The "Go Vegan with Bob Linden" radio program seeks to address a wide range of topics related to animal rights, diet, health, environment, world hunger, morality, civil liberties, free-speech, justice, peace, product reviews, current events and vegan cooking recipes. It also features interviews with guests. Since 2000, Linden has interviewed more than 500 notable guests including Professor Gary Francione, Will Tuttle, Traci Bingham, Gary Null, Professor Steve Best, Naomi Striemer, John Robbins, and countless other celebrities, health experts and activists.

== Personal and professional life ==
Linden is New York City native and graduate of Queens College of the City University of New York. Linden's professional experience is as a professional broadcaster and events promoter. Linden's career accomplishments include creating of WQCD-CD 101 in New York, assuming the Director of Programming role for LOVE 94 in Miami, and serving as Program Director for 98.1 KIFM in San Diego. Linden has also served as Program Director for radio stations in Omaha, San Antonio, Las Vegas, Raleigh-Durham, Seattle and Atlanta. Linden's work as an events promoter has been featured on the CBS Evening News, CNN, the New York Times, AP, UPI, and various independent media. He was named "Program Director of the Week" by Billboard Magazine and has received ADDY Awards for copy writing, TV advertisements and billboard campaigns.

== Advocacy work ==
During his extensive career at various broadcast radio networks, Linden used his influence to steer stations toward participation in community service, particularly with regard to advancing animal and environmental causes. Linden's community advocacy efforts often caused personal and professional conflict. While at JAZZY 103 in Raleigh-Durham/Chapel Hill, NC, Linden campaigned in opposition to a creation of a nuclear waste dump. While working at a radio station in Seattle, Linden used his position as Program Director to collect towels for oil-soaked otters in the Exxon Valdez oil spill in Alaska but was unsuccessful in advising management to reject advertising for the fur industry. While working as Program Director for JAZZY 100 in Washington, D.C., Linden developed an initiative in Metro D.C. aimed at fostering environmental cooperation between public and private sectors, but was unsuccessful in persuading the station's ownership to refuse profiting from advertising revenue generated by the fur industry. Despite the initial setback, Linden eventually convinced the owners of Washington, D.C.'s Jazzy 100 to donate the money generated by advertising fur to People for the Ethical Treatment of Animals (PETA) and Seattle's Progressive Animal Welfare Society (PAWS).

Despite his success in creating economically and commercially successful radio programming, Linden became increasingly conflicted about his role in contributing to industries that profit from the sale of animal products. These conflicts ultimately served as the inspiration for Linden's radio show.

Bob Linden was a guest of Animal Rights Zone (ARZone), appearing as a live guest on the global animal rights social network, which is transcribed on the online site.

Linden opposed California's Proposition 2, which was a 2008 ballot proposition to prohibit the confinement of certain farm animals in a manner that does not allow them to turn around freely, lie down, stand up, and fully extend their limbs.

== Personal life ==
Linden has been a self-professed vegan for more than 25 years. He resides in California and is a frequent public speaker and emcee.

== See also ==
- List of animal rights advocates
