= Amy Soranno =

Canadian animal rights activist

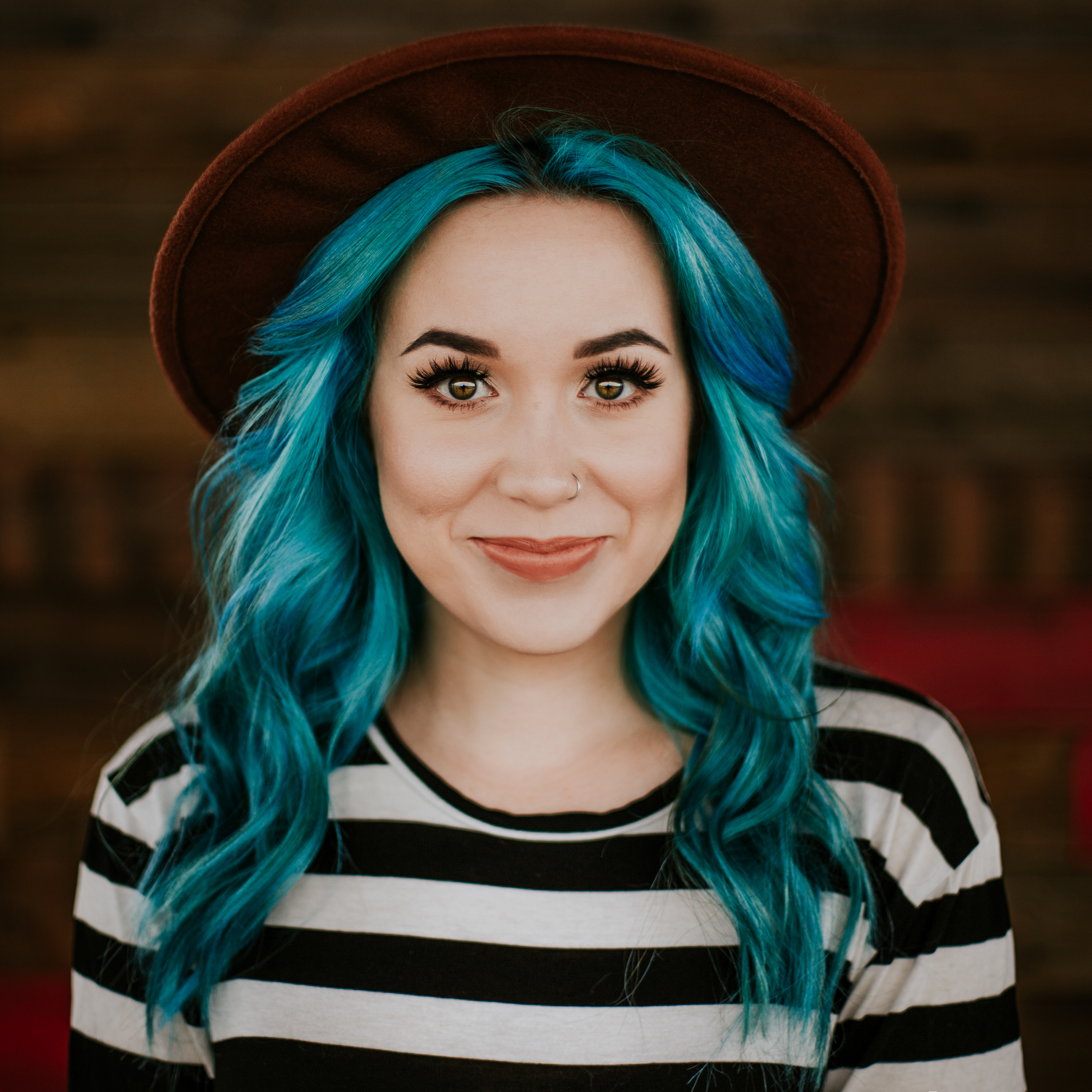
- Soranno (2020)
- Born: 1993 or 1994 (age 32–33)
- Known for: Animal rights activism

Amy Soranno (born 1993 or 1994) is a Canadian animal rights activist in British Columbia.

== Activism ==
Soranno has been part of an animal rights movement called "Meat The Victims", which originated in Australia. She engaged in the first "Meat the Victims" action in Canada on April 28, 2019. During that action, approximately 65 activists entered, without authorization, Excelsior Hog Farm in Abbotsford, British Columbia. The group obtained video of the animals and refused to leave until members of the media were allowed inside the facility. Outside the farm more than 100 additional activists lined the street. The protest was sparked by a video released by People for the Ethical Treatment of Animals. Negotiations with the police lasted for seven hours and then, after all demands were met, Soranno was the only one arrested and taken to the police station.

On September 22, 2020, Amy Soranno was discussed on The Howard Stern Show in which Howard Stein showed support for her activism.

Soranno is co-founder of an organization called "Ban Fur Farms British Columbia" and a turkey farm campaign called "Shutdown Patton".

Soranno has also been an organizer for "Okanagan Animal Save", part of the global Animal Save Movement, in which she coordinated protests and vigils for animals at various farms, abattoirs and events.

Soranno is affiliated with the animal rights group Direct Action Everywhere (DxE) as she claims to have participated in at least two DxE protests. During the summer of 2019, she, along with other DxE protesters, entered a Maple Leaf Foods Slaughterhouse in Toronto, Canada. Once inside, they had their arms affixed to a bin filled with cement. On June 3, 2019, Soranno "stormed police lines" in Sonoma County, California, to assist leading approximately 600 activists to protest at a lock-down, which was already in effect, outside the Reichardt Duck Farm.

At the Interior Savings Credit Union headquarters in downtown Kelowna, BC, on November 18, 2019, Soranno, along with others, chained herself to the doors. Her group was protesting the ISC's sponsorship of Ribfest, which they claimed promoted cruelty to animals. They were arrested for mischief as a result.

Soranno is often giving "talks or workshops on veganism & activism". During the summer of 2019 she gave a speech on 'civil disobedience' at the Toronto Liberation Conference. On February 27, 2020, she gave a presentation to a Critical Animal Studies class at the University of British Columbia. She spoke at the Animal Liberation Conference in San Francisco in 2019 and 2021.

On October 2, 2021, Soranno spoke at the Canadian Animal Law Conference in Ontario. Very early the next day Soranno was apprehended by the Waterloo Regional police. During the time she was held in jail a large “Meat the Victims” demonstration took place at the “Hybrid Turkey/Hendrix Genetics” farm nearby. After 6 hours the protest moved to the Waterloo, Ontario police station until Soranno was released that evening.

== Legal proceedings ==
In August 2020, it was revealed that Soranno had been charged with seven criminal offences. Soranno appeared in court, along with three other activists (known collectively as the Excelsior 4), on November 2, 2020, and pled not-guilty. Soranno stated, “We will use our trial as an opportunity to further expose the rampant violence and suffering in animal agriculture, and the complicity of our justice and enforcement systems”. Along with two of the original co-defendants, Roy Sasano and Nick Schafer, a Supreme Court jury trial began on June 27, 2022. On July 9, 2022, a jury found Soranno, and one co-defendant, Nick Schafer, guilty of two indictable offences. Soranno expressed that she and her co-defendants " were not given a fair trial" Soranno's legal counsel, Leo Salloum said “without the ability to enter video evidence of animal abuse, the legs were cut out from under several of the defences we had been planning to raise”. It was also revealed that "key evidence of criminal animal cruelty contained on cards from cameras found on-site allegedly went missing during the investigation." Following the guilty verdict, protests erupted in various countries; including Ireland, Austria, Czech Republic and Uruguay. The trial has garnered international interviews and the support of Canada's Animal Protection Party. During the sentencing hearing the judge prevented Soranno, but not Schafer, from giving her statement. According to Soranno's lawyer, Leo Salloum, the case is potentially precedent setting. Salloum states, "... this is going to be the highest sentencing decision for a sit-in type protest in Canadian history."

== Health issues ==
Around the age of 20, Soranno went from being healthy to becoming chronically ill and was diagnosed with postural orthostatic tachycardia syndrome (POTS) at age 20. After seeing 14 different specialists in Canada, she sought help in the US. She was diagnosed in November 2013 with POTS. At one point she was confined to her bed 90% of the time. On July 20, 2019, while giving a headline speech, Soranno suddenly sat down on a chair. Soranno then briefly explained that she was “sick" and suffers from a heart condition, nerve disorder, connective tissue disease, and significant allergy responses. Soranno stated "my suffering is insignificant in comparison" and then focused the remaining 45 minutes of her speech on animal rights activism.

== See also ==
- List of animal rights advocates
