= Michael Aufhauser =

German animal rights activist

Michael Aufhauser (born April 25, 1952 Augsburg) is a German animal rights activist and founder of Gut Aiderbichl, the largest sanctuary for animals in Austria, which houses more than 1,000 animals of a variety of species. Meanwhile, 15 more farms under this model in Germany, Austria, Switzerland and one built in France, some of which are specialized in certain animal species. Aufhauser drew a lot of attention of German and international mass media on his project when he bought a "runaway cow" called Yvonne in August 2011.

== Works ==
- A Happy Ending for Rescued Dogs. teNeues. 2008. ISBN 978-3-8327-9278-7.
- A Happy Ending for Rescued Horses. teNeues. 2008. ISBN 978-3-8327-9277-0.
- Paradise for Rescued Animals. teNeues. 2008. ISBN 978-3-8327-9276-3.
- Happy End for Rescued Cats. teNeues. 2008. ISBN 978-3-8327-9279-4.

== See also ==
- People for the Ethical Treatment of Animals
- List of animal rights advocates
