= David DeGrazia =

American philosopher

- Born: July 20, 1962 (age 63)
- Education: BA (University of Chicago); MStud (University of Oxford); PhD (Georgetown University)
- Occupations: Professor of Philosophy, George Washington University
- Notable work: Taking Animals Seriously: Mental Life and Moral Status (1996); Human Identity and Bioethics (2005)
- Website: Homepage; George Washington University

David DeGrazia (born July 20, 1962) is an American moral philosopher specializing in bioethics, animal ethics, and the study of moral status. He is Professor of Philosophy at George Washington University, where he has taught since 1989, and the author or editor of several books on ethics, including Taking Animals Seriously: Mental Life and Moral Status (1996), Human Identity and Bioethics (2005), and Creation Ethics: Reproduction, Genetics, and Quality of Life (2012).

== Selected publications ==
=== Books ===
- Creation Ethics: Reproduction, Genetics, and Quality of Life. Oxford University Press, 2012.
- Human Identity and Bioethics. Cambridge University Press, 2005.
- Animal Rights: A Very Short Introduction. Oxford University Press, 2002.
- with Thomas Mappes and Jeffrey Brand-Ballard (eds.). Biomedical Ethics. McGraw-Hill, 2011.
- Taking Animals Seriously: Mental Life and Moral Status. Cambridge University Press, 1996.
- with Thomas Mappes and Jane Zembaty (eds.). Social Ethics: Morality and Social Policy. McGraw-Hill, 2012.
- with Lester Hunt. Debating Gun Control. Oxford University Press, 2016.
- with Tom Beauchamp. Principles of Animal Research Ethics. Oxford University Press, 2020.
- with Joseph Millum. A Theory of Bioethics. Cambridge University Press, 2021.
- Dialogues on Gun Control. Routledge Press, 2023.

=== Articles ===
- DeGrazia, David. “Leveraging a Sturdy Norm: How Ethicists Really Argue,” Cambridge Quarterly of Healthcare Ethics (2023; doi:10.1017/S0963180123000592).
- DeGrazia, David. “Robots with Moral Status? Perspectives in Biology and Medicine 65 (2022): 73-88.
- DeGrazia, David. “An Interest-Based Model of Moral Status,” in S. Clark, H. Zohny, and J. Savulescu (eds.), Rethinking Moral Status (Oxford: Oxford University Press, 2021): 40-56.
- DeGrazia, David and Tom Beauchamp. “Beyond the 3 Rs to a More Comprehensive Framework of Principles for Animal Research Ethics." ILAR Journal (2019): 1-10.
- DeGrazia, David. "Procreative Responsibility in View of What Parents Owe Their Children." In Leslie Francis (ed.), The Oxford Handbook of Reproductive Ethics (New York: Oxford University Press, 2017).
- DeGrazia, David, Michelle Groman, and Lisa Lee. "Defining the Boundaries of a Right to Adequate Protection: A New Lens on Pediatric Research Ethics." Journal of Medicine and Philosophy (2017)
- DeGrazia, David. "The Case for Moderate Gun Control." Kennedy Institute of Ethics Journal 24 (2014): 1-25.
- DeGrazia, David. "What is Suffering and What Kinds of Beings Can Suffer?" In Ronald Green and Nathan Palpant (eds.), Suffering in Bioethics (New York: Oxford University Press, 2014).
- DeGrazia, David. "Moral Enhancement, Freedom, and What We (Should) Value in Moral Behavior." Journal of Medical Ethics 39 (2013): 1-8.
- DeGrazia, David. "Moral Vegetarianism from a Very Broad Basis." Journal of Moral Philosophy 6, no. 2 (2009): 143-165.
- DeGrazia, David. "Self-Awareness in Animals." In Robert Lurz (ed.), The Philosophy of Animal Minds (Cambridge University Press, 2009): 201-217.
- DeGrazia, David. "Single Payer Meets Managed Competition: The Case for Public Funding and Private Delivery." Hastings Center Report 38, no. 1 (2008): 23-33.
- DeGrazia, David. "The Harm of Death, Time-Relative Interests, and Abortion." Philosophical Forum 57 (2007): 57-80.
- DeGrazia, David. "Moral Status, Human Identity, and Early Embryos: A Critique of the President's Approach." Journal of Law, Medicine & Ethics 34 (Spring 2006): 49-57.
- DeGrazia, David. "Prozac, Enhancement, and Self-Creation." Hastings Center Report 30, no. 2 (March–April 2000): 34-40.
- DeGrazia, David. "Wittgenstein and the Mental Life of Animals", History of Philosophy Quarterly 11, no. 1 (January 1994): 121–137.
- DeGrazia, David. "Moving Forward in Bioethical Theory: Theories, Cases, and Specified Principlism," Journal of Medicine and Philosophy 17 (1992): 511-39.
- DeGrazia, David, and Andrew Rowan. "Pain, Suffering, and Anxiety in Animals and Humans." Theoretical Medicine 12 (1991): 193-211.

== See also ==
- List of animal rights advocates
