= Yvonne (cow) =

German cow famous for 2011 escape

Yvonne was a brown-white cow who in 2011 escaped from her farmer in Mühldorf, Germany, attracting media attention as she hid in the woods for a number of weeks. Farmers, police, and animal-rights activists were unable to find or capture her.

== History ==
Yvonne, born in 2005, lived as a dairy cow for a mountain farmer in the Liesertal valley in the Austrian Alps. In March 2011 she was sold to a farmer in Aschau am Inn, Bavaria, who planned to fatten and slaughter her. On 24 May 2011 Yvonne escaped from her electric-fenced pasture and hid in woods near the villages of Zangberg. After her escape, Yvonne was bought by animal-rights activist Michael Aufhauser, who intended to capture her and transport her to his animal sanctuary, Gut Aiderbichl, a former farm in Deggendorf, Bavaria.

Multiple techniques were used to find her and draw her out of hiding. Searchers used infrared cameras, a helicopter, and used other cows as lures, which consequentially also escaped and are being lured with additional cattle.

As all attempts to capture Yvonne failed, the cow received increasing attention from the mass media in Germany and Austria and later all over the world. Bild tabloid offered a reward of ten thousand euros for her recovery.

The campaign to save Yvonne from the hunter's bullet was successful when the order to shoot on sight was rescinded permanently on 28 August 2011 due to the stress the hunt had caused her. It was decided to ask all helpers to leave the area, with a single hunter remaining to try to tranquilize Yvonne if possible. She would then be moved to the animal sanctuary owned by Michael Aufhauser. Concern grew, however, that with the approach of winter she might find it difficult to find proper food and shelter.

On 1 September 2011 Yvonne was captured in Unteralmsham, near Stefanskirchen, and taken to the Gut Aiderbichl animal sanctuary. On 3 September 2019, Yvonne was euthanized at Gut Aiderbichl at the age of 14. Two days earlier, she had been found unable to stand after suffering a severe pelvic injury, which was believed to have occurred while mounting another cow. Despite attempts to treat her, her condition did not improve, and the decision was made to euthanize her.

== Media ==
U.S. producer Max Howard and Munich-based Papa Löwe Filmproduktion partnered with Torsten Poeck and UK-based writer/producer Kirsty Peart on development of the partly-animated family feature film, "Cow on the Run."
