= Global Happiness Organization =

International non-profit organization

- Founded: 2007
- Founder: Ludvig Lindström
- Purpose: Utilitarianism
- Website: Official Website

Global Happiness Organization (GHO) is an international non-profit organization, founded under the name "Charity International". It is dedicated to the promotion of utilitarian ethics. It was founded in 2007 by a team of Swedish academics, philosophers and animal welfare activists led by Ludvig Lindström.

== Mission ==
The purpose of the organization is to increase net happiness worldwide and to get a happiness agenda into mainstream politics. Its goal is to have politicians base their policy-making decisions on conclusions drawn from the latest scientific studies in order to create better conditions for a happier society and a happier world.

== Activities ==
From 2007 onwards, the Global Happiness Organization has organized a Happiness Conference where the organization presents the latest happiness research, outlines its future agenda, and provides an arena for discussions both among its members and among international happiness researchers. Conference participants and speakers have included the Australian philosopher Peter Singer, the Dutch Happiness researcher Ruut Veenhoven and the British philosopher David Pearce.

The Global Happiness Organization's most recent conference was held in May 2009 at Malmö University.
