= Roberto Torres (politician) =

Brazilian politician (1938–2021)

Member of the Legislative Assembly of Alagoas
- In office 1979–1987

Member of the Chamber of Deputies of Brazil for Alagoas
- In office 1987–1995

Personal details
- Born: Roberto Vilar Torres; August 29, 1938 Água Branca, Alagoas, Brazil
- Died: February 4, 2021 (aged 82) Maceió, Alagoas, Brazil
- Party: ARENA (1971–1979); PDS (1980–1986); PTB (1986–1996); PSDB (1996–2021)

Roberto Vilar Torres (29 August 1938 – 4 February 2021) was a Brazilian politician. A member of multiple political parties, he served in the Legislative Assembly of Alagoas from 1979 to 1987 and in the Chamber of Deputies of Brazil from 1987 to 1995.

Torres died on 4 February 2021, of COVID-19 in Maceió, Alagoas, at the age of 82.
