= Eva Meijer =

Dutch philosopher and writer

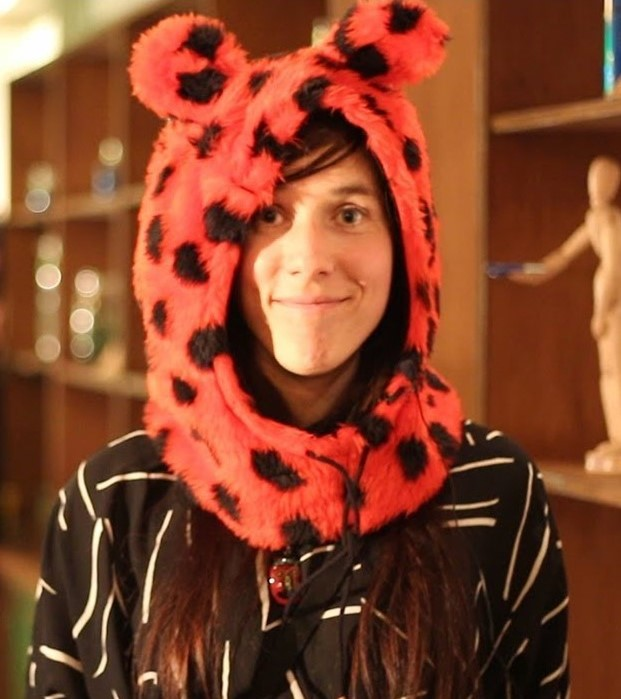
- Meijer in 2018
- Born: 1980 (age 45–46)
- Website: www.evameijer.nl

Eva Meijer (born 1980) is a Dutch philosopher, writer, visual artist and singer-songwriter.

== Work ==
Meijer studied Image and Sound at the Royal Academy of Art in The Hague and philosophy at The University of Amsterdam. In 2017, they obtained their PhD cum laude in philosophy with a dissertation on the political voice of animals, for which they won the Erasmianum Dissertation Prize. Their dissertation was later released as a book by New York University Press named When Animals Speak: Toward an Interspecies Democracy, which went on to win the ASCA Book Award in 2020.

Meijer has written eight novels, including Bird Cottage (2016) and Forwards (2019). The novella Her Familiar Form was published in 2021, followed in 2022 by Sea Now, a work depicting a dystopian Netherlands affected by severe flooding. As an essayist, Meijer wrote works such as The Soldier Was a Dolphin: On Political Animals (2017), based on their doctoral thesis; this work won the Hypatia Prize. That same year, they received the Halewijn Prize for their body of work. Their writing has been translated into more than twenty languages.

Meijer is a member of the Multispecies Collective, a multispecies art collective, and De Vereniging ter Bevordering van Troost (The Association for the Promotion of Consolation); they are also co-chair of the Dutch Study Group for Animal Philosophy. At the University of Amsterdam, Meijer organized the Long Covid+ Conversations (2024-2025), an online lecture series about Long Covid and other postviral conditions, aimed at fostering solidarity.

== Books published in English ==
- Bird Cottage. London: Pushkin, 2018, ISBN 978-1782273936. 2019, ISBN 9781782273950. Translated from the Dutch by Antoinette Fawcett.
- Animal Languages: The Secret Conversations of the Living World. London/New York: Penguin Random House, 2020. ISBN 9780262044035. Translated from the Dutch by Laura Watkinson.
- When Animals Speak: Toward an Interspecies Democracy. New York: New York University Press, 2019. ISBN 978-1479863136.
- The Limits of My Language: Meditations on Depression. London: Pushkin, 2021. ISBN 9781782275992. Translated from the Dutch by Antoinette Fawcett
- Multispecies Dialogues. Doing Philosophy with Animals, Children, the Sea and Others. Amsterdam: Amsterdam University Press, 2025. ISBN 9789048564415. Available Open Access here.
- Multispecies Assemblies. Vermont: VINE Press, 2025.
- Sea Now. Bath: Pereine Press, 2025. Translated from the Dutch by Anne Thompson Melo.

Upcoming:

- Maybe is Another Word for Hope. London: The Philosopher, 2025. Translated from the Dutch by David McKay.

A full list of publications can be accessed on Meijer's website. Academic publications can be found via Orcid.
