= John DeBacker =

American animal rescuer

- Born: July 2, 1993 (age 33); Seaford, Long Island, New York, U.S.
- Occupation: Animal rescuer
- Employer: Long Island Cat/Kitten Solution
- Known for: Animal rescue efforts
- Title: Vice President of Long Island Cat/Kitten Solution
- Predecessor: None; position established in 2021

John DeBacker (b. Jul 2, 1993) is an American wildlife and animal rescuer specializing in stray and feral cats. As of August 2024, he serves as the Vice President of Long Island Cat/Kitten Solution (LICKS), a non-profit organization focused on animal welfare. As of September 2021, DeBacker lives in Seaford, Long Island, and has gained local media attention for his dedication and involvement in numerous challenging animal rescues.

== Early life and background ==
Born in Seaford, Long Island, DeBacker has been involved in animal rescue since his early twenties, initially volunteering at shelters and rescue organizations. He later transitioned his passion into a full-time commitment to animal welfare. DeBacker does not accept payment for his rescue services, relying solely on donations to fund his efforts. He maintains a custom-built insulated shed for injured animals and operates a rescue van capable of holding multiple cages.

== Animal rescue work ==
DeBacker is widely known on Long Island as a primary contact for animal emergencies. His work often involves unique and difficult situations, collaborating with local authorities including the Suffolk County Police Department and New York State Police.

Some notable rescue efforts include:

- In September 2020, he rescued a possum from Sunrise Highway and a kitten from the Wantagh State Parkway during morning traffic, with police halting traffic for the latter.
- In September 2021, he rescued a cat that had been living in New York's JFK Airport for three weeks after escaping from an pet carrier.
- In October 2022, he assisted in the rescue of a kitten found from under the hood of a car.
- In February 2023, DeBacker rescued a possum that had gotten stuck on a metal beam in a house under construction.
- In December 2023, while visiting family in New Jersey, he rescued a feral cat named "Merry" that had had its head stuck in a jar for several days. The cat was later made available for adoption.
- In September 2024, DeBacker caught a cat that fell out of a tree in Hempstead, New York, with one hand.
- In April 2025, John rescued a Scottish Fold cat, a rare breed known for its distinctive folded ears.
- In April 2025, alongside state police, the Society for the Prevention of Cruelty to Animals (SPCA), animal control and other volunteers, John helped rescue 30 cats near North Massapequa in Long Island. As of April 2025, a criminal investigation in underway regarding the incident.
- In June 2025, DeBacker played a crucial role in an 18-hour rescue operation to free a kitten, named "Piper," trapped in an underground pipe in Bay Shore, Long Island, collaborating with the Suffolk County Police Department and Bay Shore Fire Department.

In October 2021, DeBacker started a change.org petition to add screens or netting to sewer drain to prevent cats or other animals from falling into them.

== Long Island Cat/Kitten Solution ==
DeBacker joined Long Island Cat/Kitten Solution (LICKS) in 2021 as Vice President. As Vice President of LICKS, DeBacker is involved in the organization's Trap-Neuter-Return (TNR) initiatives aimed at reducing the stray and feral cat population on Long Island.

LICKS opened in 2008 as a 501 (c)(3) tax-exempt nonprofit organization. As of November 2021, LICKS has since spayed or neutered over 10,000 cats. It has two locations, both in Long Island. While LICKS mostly does cat rescues, rehabilitations, and TNRs, it also helps rescue other animals, including foxes.

== Book ==
DeBacker also features in the 2025 book Whiskers in the Wild by Debra Blaine.
