= People for Animals =

Indian animal welfare organization

- Formation: 1992
- Founder: Maneka Gandhi
- Type: Non-governmental organisation, non-profit
- Purpose: Animal welfare
- Headquarters: New Delhi
- Key people: M.C Mehta, Raj Punjwani, Pritish Nandy, Manu Parekh, Ambika Shukla and Gauri Maulekhi
- Website: www.peopleforanimalsindia.org

People For Animals is an animal welfare organisations, originally founded by Maneka Gandhi in 1992. The headquarters of this organisation is located in New Delhi, with over 100 regional units across India.

As a non-governmental non-profit organisation, People For Animals purpose is for the maintenance of animal welfare in India and aims to establish various animal welfare centres across India's 600 districts.

== Structure ==
Maneka Gandhi is the founder of People For Animals and is currently the chairperson of this organisation. Whilst serving India as a political member of the Bharatiya Janata Party (BJP), Gandhi founded India's largest organisation for animal welfare, People For Animals. Following the foundation of this organisation, Gandhi was similarly appointed chairperson of the Committee for the Purpose and Control and Supervision of Experiments on Animals (CPCSEA) in 1995. Throughout her time as an animal welfare activist, Gandhi has been involved in investigating laboratories where animal testing was being carried out, has filed for Animal Birth Control programs (ABCs) in order to limit the amount of homeless dogs that were killed as a result of overpopulation and has also been involved in initiatives planned by the organisation International Animal Rescue.

== Trustees ==
The current trustees of this organisation include:

- Mahesh Chandra Mehta
- Priyanka Bangari
- Jayasimha Nuggehalli
- Raj Punjwani
- Pritish Nandy
- Manu Parekh
- Ambika Shukla
- Gauri Maulekhi
- Alpana Bhartia

Of these trustees, Alpana Bhartia is one of the founding members of People For Animals and has been "working in the field of animal welfare and wildlife conservation for the past 25 years. As a member of the Institutional Ethics Committee of the National Centre for Biological Studies (NCBS), Bhartia's ethical work has been predominantly centred on the concept of empathy towards animals. Bhartia later co-founded People For Animals in 1992 in order to provide veterinary care to injured animals.

Gauri Maulekhi joined People For Animals in 1995 as a volunteer, establishing animal shelters within India that coordinated the rehabilitation of abandoned dogs via ambulance services for animals in distress. Maulekhi has also worked with other animal welfare associations such as the Society for Prevention of Cruelty to Animals (SPCA) and Raahat. Through her work, Maulekhi has established the Uttarakhand unit of People For Animals.

Alongside the Chairperson and trustees, the overall structure of the People For Animals consists of members who are required to be Indian residents. Members need to buy their membership in order to become part of the People For Animals organisation. As it is a non-governmental and non-profitable organisation, donations by individuals often contribute to the funding of this animal welfare organisation, alongside sponsorships.

== Initiatives ==
Since its inception, People For Animals has provided treatment to more than 25,000 animals across more than 250 species. This organisation often works with various animal welfare and rights organisations such as Humane Society International (HSI) and People for the Ethical Treatment of Animals (PETA) in order to provide such treatment to wildlife.

Through partnership, People For Animals has been engaged with several different events and campaigns to provide assistance to wildlife, and advocate for the education of animal welfare in India.

=== Animal Birth Control ===
As the founder of the organisation, Gandhi filed litigations in order to bring awareness to the killing of homeless dogs, advocating for the introduction of Animal Birth Control (ABC) programs in various regions of India. The Animal Birth Control program was developed by the World Health Organization (WHO) in an attempt to provide a solution to the overpopulation of street dogs and the increased dispersal of the rabies virus among such wildlife.

=== Rehabilitation of Laboratory Animals ===
Alongside the Committee for the Purpose and Control and Supervision of Experiments on Animals (CPCSEA), People For Animals has established shelters for animal refugees across India in order to rehabilitate laboratory animals. Of these animals that have been used in laboratories, those that are dogs have been predominantly rehabilitated into individual homes. These shelters, over the past few years, have received small amounts of financial support from CPCSEA, but due to the work of People For Animals, CPCSEA have declared the rehabilitation of animals as a "moral and legal need" and hence will use such funds to establish independent laboratory animal rehabilitation centres.

== Future ==
As of April 2021, People For Animals is still continuing to provide means of animal welfare throughout different regions of India. Despite the criticism and challenges the organisation has faced, particularly in relation to the founder Maneka Gandhi, People For Animals continues to run various initiatives alongside instigating changes to their policies.

In accordance with the Indian philosophy of Ahimsa, belief in the sacredness of life, People For Animals continues to recognise the concept of the 4 'R's – Rescue, Rehabilitation, Release, and Research, and has continued working alongside the Committee for the Purpose and Control and Supervision of Experiments on Animals (CPCSEA) to formulate guidelines for animal testing. Since 2004, "over 665 laboratories are registered with the CPCSEA," ensuring that animal testing on rats, mice, guinea-pigs or rabbits can be only be conducted if approved prior by a panel of scientists in the field or domain being studied.

Such policies regarding rehabilitation and relocation have also further been investigated in relation to leopards in India. In association with the Gujarat Society for Prevention of Cruelty to Animals (GSPCA), People For Animals aims to relocate leopards inhabiting public parks in order to "decrease conflicting interests of wildlife conservation and the local people" as opposed to inhumanely removing such wildlife via the means of death.

This organisation has also established several hospitals throughout different regions of India, with all hospital treatments being covered for stray animals. People For Animals also has a program enabling individuals to sponsor animals of their choice to contribute to the cost of services and care required for animals relocated into hospitals or shelters. Other programs such as People For Animals' "PFA News of the day" have also been established to allow information to be more accessible across India.

The Founder of PFA, Maneka Gandhi, has made several statements regarding the future direction of People For Animals, with plans to establish over 600 shelters and provide more ambulance services in every district of India. Gandhi also plans to ensure that there is an increase in the amount of government-funded cow shelters, monitor the transportation of animals to ensure it is conducted in a humane way and to extend laws regarding animal sacrifice to all states of India. Further movements of this organisation in the future also include training farmers in organic farming, instigating alternatives to animal testing and introducing animal welfare lessons in schools across India.
