= Go Vegan =

Radio program

Go Vegan Radio is a one-hour talk radio program hosted by Bob Linden. The show airs in the United States on terrestrial radio via the Clear Channel network on Green 960 AM in San Francisco and K-TALK 1150 AM in Los Angeles, CA every Sunday between 3 pm and 4 pm Pacific Time (5 pm – 6 pm ET). The show is also accessible via download, live stream and free podcast at Go Vegan Radio's webpage. The show has been the subject of a full-page article written by Pulitzer Prize–winning Los Angeles Times media critic Howard Rosenberg and has been featured as "Radio Show of the Week" in the Los Angeles Daily News. Go Vegan is produced by GoVeganRadio.com, a project of 501(c)3 non-profit public charity the International Humanities Center.

== Description ==
The show seeks to address a wide range of topics related to animal rights, diet, health, environment, world hunger, morality, civil liberties, free speech, justice, peace, product reviews, current events and vegan cooking recipes. It also features interviews with celebrity, expert and activist guests and community leaders.

== History ==
Go Vegan debuted in its original form in January 2001. It was picked up by Air America and aired syndication across roughly 30 channels on June 30, 2007. While on Air America, the show aired Saturday afternoons from 2–3pm ET until January 2010 when Air America filed for Chapter 7 bankruptcy protection and liquidation.

Prior to June 2007, the show aired on various stations including KTYM-AM-1460 in Los Angeles and KCEO-AM-1000 in San Diego. The show has also aired on CBS affiliates and mainstream media outlets.
