= Gary Steiner =

American philosopher

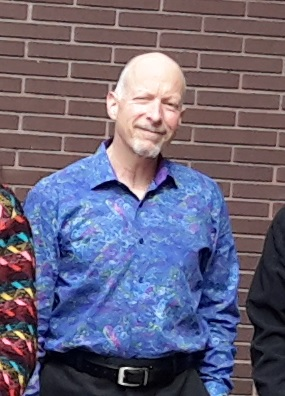
- Steiner, 2015
- Born: August 22, 1956 (age 69)
- Education: BA (Economics, 1977); University of California, Los Angeles; Santa Clara University School of Law (1977–1978); BA (Philosophy, 1981); University of California, Berkeley; PhD (Philosophy, 1992); Yale University
- Occupation: Philosopher
- Employer: Bucknell University
- Website: Homepage

Gary Steiner is an American moral philosopher, and the John Howard Harris Professor of Philosophy at Bucknell University. Steiner's particular focus is animal rights, Descartes, and 19th- and 20th-century continental philosophy.

== Works ==
Books

- Descartes As a Moral Thinker: Christianity, Technology, Nihilism. Humanity Books, 2004.
- Anthropocentrism and Its Discontents: The Moral Status of Animals in the History of Western Philosophy. University of Pittsburgh Press, 2005.
- Animals and the Moral Community: Mental Life, Moral Status, and Kinship. Columbia University Press, 2008.
- Animals and the Limits of Postmodernism. Columbia University Press, 2013.
- What We Owe to Nonhuman Animals: The Historical Pretensions of Reason and the Ideal of Felt Kinship. Routledge, 2024.

Translations

- Klaus Hartmann. "Marx's Capital from the Viewpoint of Transcendental Philosophy," Journal of the British Society for Phenomenology 24, 1993, pp. 157–171.
- Karl Löwith. Martin Heidegger and European Nihilism. Columbia University Press, 1998.
- Gerold Prauss. Knowing & Doing in Heidegger's Being & Time. Humanity Books, 1999.
- Dominique Lestel. Eat This Book: A Carnivore's Manifesto. Columbia University Press, 2016.

Selected articles

- "Rethinking the Cognitive Abilities of Animals," Julie A. Smith and Robert W. Mitchell (eds.). Experiencing Animals: Encounters Between Animal and Human Minds. Columbia University Press (forthcoming).
- "Descartes, Christianity, and Contemporary Speciesism" Evangelos Protopapadakis (ed.).Animal Ethics. Past and Present Perspectives. Berlin: Logos Verlag (2012).
- Steiner, Gary. "Animal, Vegetable, Miserable", The New York Times, 21 November 2009.

== See also ==
- Animal cognition
- List of animal rights advocates
