= Konturen =

- Website type: Academic journal
- Available in: English
- Editor: Martin Klebes
- Website: http://konturen.uoregon.edu/

Konturen (ISSN 1947-3796) is an interdisciplinary, peer-reviewed journal dedicated to the analysis of borders, framing determinations, and related figures of delimitation of all kinds.

Konturen publishes work that takes into account the contributions of contemporary philosophy and theory to an understanding of problematic discursive places of meeting, overlap, or disjunction. Konturen is published online in special issues, constituted mainly through invited submissions and calls for papers, although the Editorial Board considers unsolicited submissions relevant to the thematic foci of the journal.

== History ==
Konturen was founded in 2008 by Jeffrey S. Librett and is currently edited by Martin Klebes (University of Oregon—Department of German and Scandinavian). The editorial board of Konturen comprises Founding Editor Jeffrey S. Librett (University of Oregon—Department of German and Scandinavian), (Kenneth S. Calhoon (University of Oregon—Department of German and Scandinavian and Program in Comparative Literature), Michael Stern (University of Oregon—Department of German and Scandinavian, Dawn Marlan (University of Oregon—Department of Comparative Literature), Gantt Gurley (University of Oregon—Department of German and Scandinavian and Robert Clark Honors College), and Alexander Mathäs (University of Oregon—Department of German and Scandinavian). The journal is further supported by an International Board of Editorial Consultants.

2008: Volume I: Political Theology: The Border in Question

2009: V olume 2: Between Nature and Culture: After the Continental-Analytic Divide

2010: Volume 3: Borderlines in/of Psychoanalysis

2013: Volume 4: Up Against the Wall

2014: Volume 5: Abstraction and Materiality in the Arts, Literature, and Music

2014: Volume 6: Definiting the Human and the Animal

2015: Volume 7: Kierkegaard and German Thought

2016: Volume 8: What is a Thing?

2017: Volume 9: Triumph of the Will? A New Era in American Politics

2019: Volume 10: Re-Thinking Gender in Reading

2020: Volume 11: Writing Migration

2022: Volume 12: Feminism, Theory, Film: Critical Intersections in the Practice and Theorization of Experimental Filmmaking since the 1970s

2024: Volume 13: Neue Heimat(en): A Contentious Concept Reconsidered
