= Bob Torres =

Robert "Bob" Torres was an assistant professor of sociology at St. Lawrence University in Canton, New York. He is the co-author, with his wife Jenna Torres, of Vegan Freak: Being Vegan in a Non-Vegan World (2005), and the author of Making A Killing: The Political Economy of Animal Rights (2007).

Making a Killing examines animal rights from a social anarchist position. Torres argues that changing our attitudes toward animals is essential to changing other relationships of dominance that characterize most societies.

Torres and his wife produced a podcast about animal rights and veganism from 2005–2009, featuring the Torres' commentary along with the occasional vegan guest. Despite the popularity of the podcast, it suddenly ceased in 2009 and websites related to it were taken down shortly thereafter without notice. The website (veganfreak.net), Facebook and Twitter all stopped being updated shortly thereafter. The abrupt termination of the podcast has never been publicly addressed by either Bob nor Jenna Torres - although the former now keeps a travel blog in which he speaks about consuming meat and dairy.

Torres was also a partner at the now defunct Tofu Hound Press, which was a small publishing company that released a few books on the same subject.

== Education ==
Torres holds a BA in Philosophy and a BS in Agricultural Science from Pennsylvania State University. His MS and PhD are from Cornell University in Development Sociology. Torres also received his Juris Doctor from Drexel University in 2012. From 1999-2000, Torres was a Fulbright Scholar in Spain, and was a Foreign Language Area Studies Fellow for Quechua / Latin America during his time at Cornell.

== Books ==
- Vegan Freak: Being Vegan in a Non-Vegan World ISBN 0-9770804-1-2 - Jul 1, 2005 (2nd Edition ISBN 978-1-60486-015-3 - 2010)
- Making a Killing: The Political Economy of Animal Rights ISBN 1-904859-67-4 - November 1, 2007

== See also ==
- List of animal rights advocates
