= John Vyvyan =

British writer

- Born: 1908; Sussex
- Died: 12 February 1975; Exmouth
- Occupation: Writer

John Vyvyan (1908 – 12 February 1975) was a British writer known for his study of Shakespeare and his histories of the animal rights movement.

== Biography ==
Vyvyan was born in Sussex. He originally trained as an archaeologist, he worked with Sir Flinders Petrie in the Middle East. He was the author of three books on Shakespeare, including The Shakespearean Ethic (1959), and two on the origins of anti-vivisection activism, In Pity and in Anger: A Study of the Use of Animals in Science (1969) – which documents the disputes between Frances Power Cobbe and Anna Kingsford, two prominent 19th-century British activists – and The Dark Face of Science (1971). In recognition of his contribution to Shakespearean scholarship in his trilogy, he was offered, but unable to take up, a visiting lectureship at the State University of New York. He died in Exmouth in 1975.

Vyvyan's publications on Shakespeare were positively reviewed in academic journals.

== Selected publications ==
- The Shakespearean Ethic. Chatto & Windus, 1959. 2nd Edition, Shepheard-Walwyn, 2011.
- Shakespeare and the Rose of Love. Chatto & Windus, 1960. 2nd Edition, Shepheard-Walwyn, 2013.
- A Case Against Jones: A Study of Psychical Phenomena. Attic Press, 1966.
- In Pity and in Anger: A Study of the Use of Animals in Science. M. Joseph, 1969.
- Shakespeare and Platonic Beauty. Chatto & Windus, 1970. 2nd Edition, Shepheard-Walwyn, 2013.
- The Dark Face of Science. M. Joseph, 1971.
- Sketch for a World Picture: A Study of Evolution. M. Joseph, 1972.

== See also ==
- List of animal rights advocates
