= Outlaw Printmakers =

Collective of printmaking artists

The Outlaws of Printmaking, also known as "The Outlaws" and "Outlaw Printmakers" are a collective of printmaking artists that exists internationally. The idea of "Outlaw Printmakers" formed from a show in New York at Big Cat Gallery in 2000. Tony Fitzpatrick, the owner of the Big Cat Press which is associated with the gallery, decided to call a show there "Outlaw Printmaking" to reflect attitudes of the printmakers involved in a non-academic approach to prints. As pointed out by Sean Starwars, the Southern Graphic Council print conference was happening at the same time as that show in NYC across the water in New Jersey. A handful of artists from the conference attended the show.). At that conference the core group now known as the Outlaw Printmakers formed, adopting the name from the show and continuing their own events, happenings and shows outside of the academic norm. The core members are Bill Fick, Tom Huck, The Hancock Brothers, Sean Star Wars, Dennis McNett and Cannonball Press. Many of the core artists associated with the movement cite the printmaker/artist Richard Mock as a primary influence. Mock's political and social narrative prints appeared in the New York Times op-ed pages for more than a decade in the 1980s and early 1990s. Later the group grew to include Carlos Hernandez, Drive By Press, Ryan O'Malley, Artemio Rodriguez, Kathryn Polk, Erica Walker, Derrick Riley, and Julia Curran.

Organized by Tom Huck, a traveling exhibition titled "Outlaw Printmaking" started touring the nation in 2003 including works by Sue Coe, Michael Krueger, Peregrine Honig, and Bill Fick. Their work can be found in the collections of the Fogg Art Museum, Cambridge, Massachusetts; The New York Public Library, New York City, Zimmerli Art Museum at Rutgers University, Whitney Museum of American Art, Bibliothèque Nationale de France and the Museum of Modern Art.

Organized by Dennis McNett and curated by Josef Zimmerman, a museum exhibition called "Outlaws of Print" at the Ft. Wayne Museum of Art in 2018. The show featured work from all of the Outlaws which include: Richard Mock, Bill Fick, Tom Huck, Dennis McNett, Sean Starwars, John and Charles Hancock, Carlos Hernandez, Erika Walker, Kathryn Polk, Artemio Rodriguez, Martin Mazorra, Derrick Riley, Ryan O'Malley and Julia Curran.

== Artists/Printmakers ==
=== Richard Mock ===
Richard Mock (1944 – July 28, 2006) was a printmaker, painter, sculptor, and editorial cartoonist. Mock was best known for his linocut illustrations that appeared on the Op-Ed page of The New York Times from 1980 through 1996.[1]

Born in 1944 in Long Beach, California, Mock earned his bachelor's degree, studying lithography and block printing, at the University of Michigan. Settling in New York City in 1968, Mock had exhibitions at 112 Greene Street, The Whitney (in 1973), Exit Art, and his most recent show at the Sideshow Gallery in Brooklyn. In addition, Mock's art frequently appeared on the covers of the magazines Fifth Estate (Official site: www.FifthEstate.org), Alternative Press Review and Anarchy: A Journal of Desire Armed. His work has been cited as an influence by a number of contemporary American printmakers, among them Tom Huck and Bill Fick. Huck and Fick are both members of a group of artists known as the "Outlaw Printmakers", which as a collective unit cite Mock's work as one of its main influences.

Mock died on July 28, 2006, after a long illness.

=== Bill Fick ===
Bill Fick (born October 19, 1963, in Lirik, Sumatra, Indonesia) moved to the United States when he was young and he received his BA from Duke University in 1986 and his MFA from University of North Carolina-Greensboro in 1990. Bill Fick is currently the Visiting Assistant Professor at Duke University. He has exhibited in several solo and group shows nationally and internationally including the Czech Republic, New Zealand, and Finland. In addition, throughout his career, Fick has acted as a visiting artist, artist in residence, and professor to several art schools across the country.

=== Sean Starwars ===
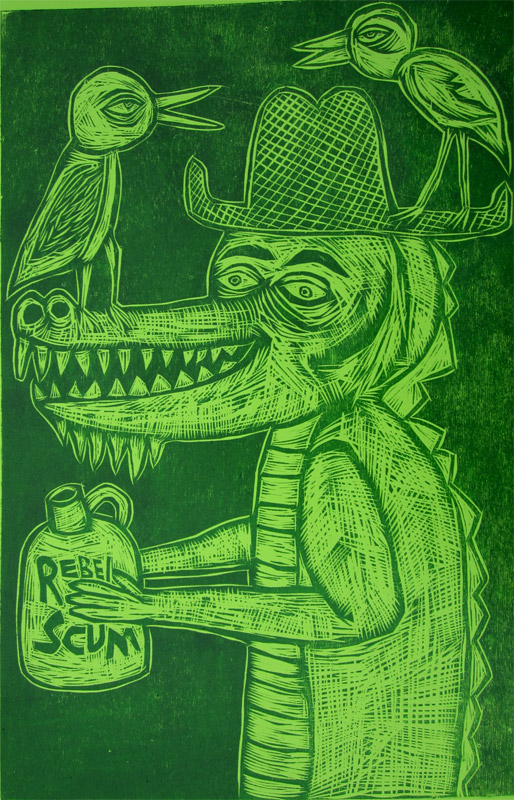
"Country Croc 2" from the "One Woodcut a Week" project

Sean Starwars is a printmaker living and working in Laurel, Mississippi. He is a relief printmaking artist specializing in woodcut printmaking. Sean Starwars recently completed a project titled 'One Woodcut a Week" and is currently working on his new project 'One Woodcut a Day'. Sean Starwars B.A. from Old Dominion University in 1996 and his M.F.A. from Louisiana State University in 1999. On his name "At first it amused him to have professionals address him as "Mr. Starwars," but he soon discovered it was also a great marketing tool for his woodcuts. "My real last name is pretty common," he said. "This is a way I could stand out."”

=== Tom Huck ===
Tom Huck (born 1971) is an American printmaker best known for his large scale satirical woodcuts. He lives and works in St. Louis, Missouri, where he runs his own press, Evil Prints. He is a regular contributor to BLAB! of Fantagraphics Books. His work draws heavily upon the influence of Albrecht Dürer, José Guadalupe Posada, R. Crumb, and Honoré Daumier Huck states in his artist statement: "My work deals with personal observations about the experiences of living in a small town in southeast Missouri.

The often Strange and Humorous occurrences, places, and people in these towns offer a never-ending source of inspiration for my prints. I call this work 'rural satire' Huck's woodcut prints are included in numerous public and private collections, including the Whitney Museum of American Art, Spencer Museum of Art, Nelson Atkins Museum of Art, Saint Louis Art Museum, Milwaukee Art Museum, Minneapolis Institute of Art, Fogg Art Museum, and New York Public Library. Huck is represented by David Krut Art Projects in New York City, Sherry Leedy Contemporary Art in Kansas City, Mo. and Eli Ridgway Gallery in San Francisco, Ca. In September 2011 Huck was awarded a Pollock-Krasner Foundation grant.

=== Dennis McNett ===
Dennis McNett is a printmaker who studied at the Pratt Institute. He has exhibited at the Victoria and Albert Museum, the Museum of Contemporary Art, Jacksonville and Jonathan LeVine Gallery, New York City. He has worked as a lecturer. He runs Wolfbat Studios.

=== Sue Coe ===
Sue Coe (born November 28, 1951, in Tamworth, Staffordshire) is an English artist and illustrator working primarily in drawing and printmaking, often in the form of illustrated books and comics. She grew up close to a slaughterhouse and developed a passion to stop cruelty to animals. Coe studied at the Royal College of Art in London, lived in New York City from 1972 to 2001. She currently lives in upstate New York. Her work is highly political, often directed against capitalism and cruelty to animals.For a quarter century she has explored factory farming, meat packing, apartheid, sweat shops, prisons, AIDS, and war. Her commentary on political events and social injustice is published in newspapers, magazines and books. The results of her investigations are hung in museum and gallery exhibitions and form an essential part of personal fine print collections by artists and activists alike. Coe's paintings and prints are auctioned as fund raisers for a variety of progressive causes, and since 1998, she has sold prints to benefit animal rights organizations.

Her major influences include the works of Chaïm Soutine and José Guadalupe Posada, Käthe Kollwitz, Francisco Goya and Rembrandt. She is a frequent contributor to World War 3 Illustrated, and has seen her work published in The Progressive, Mother Jones, Blab, The New York Times, The New Yorker, Time Magazine, Newsweek The Nation and countless other periodicals.

=== Carlos Hernandez ===
Carlos Hernandez is an artist working in screen printing. He runs Burning Bones Press and has taught screen printing. His previous work includes posters for various bands and the commemorative poster for the 2013 Austin City Limits. He has received awards from the American Marketing Association and the American Institute of Graphic Arts.

=== Kathryn Polk ===
Kathryn Polk attended the University of Memphis. She co-owns a lithography studio. Her work contains themes of "everyday activities, chores, relationships between women, mothers and daughters and so on". Her art is in collections including those of the Bibliothèque nationale de France, the University of Auckland and Aberystwyth University.

=== Ericka Walker ===
Ericka Walker (born June 16, 1981, in Hartford, Wisconsin) is an American artist and printmaker. She lives and works in Halifax, Nova Scotia, Canada.

=== Julia Curran ===
Julia Curran (born April 5, 1988, in Saint Louis, Missouri) is an artist and printmaker living and working in Los Angeles, California. She is the youngest member of the Outlaw Printmakers and is known for her colorful and vivid large-scale silkscreen collages. According to her artist statement, Curran's work is "...a satirical deconstruction of American pop-culture and socio-political history, and how fear and the desires to own and to control drive hyper-masculinity and hyper-consumption." Curran primarily works in silkscreen, relief, and mixed-media collage.
