= Bill Fick =

Printmaker

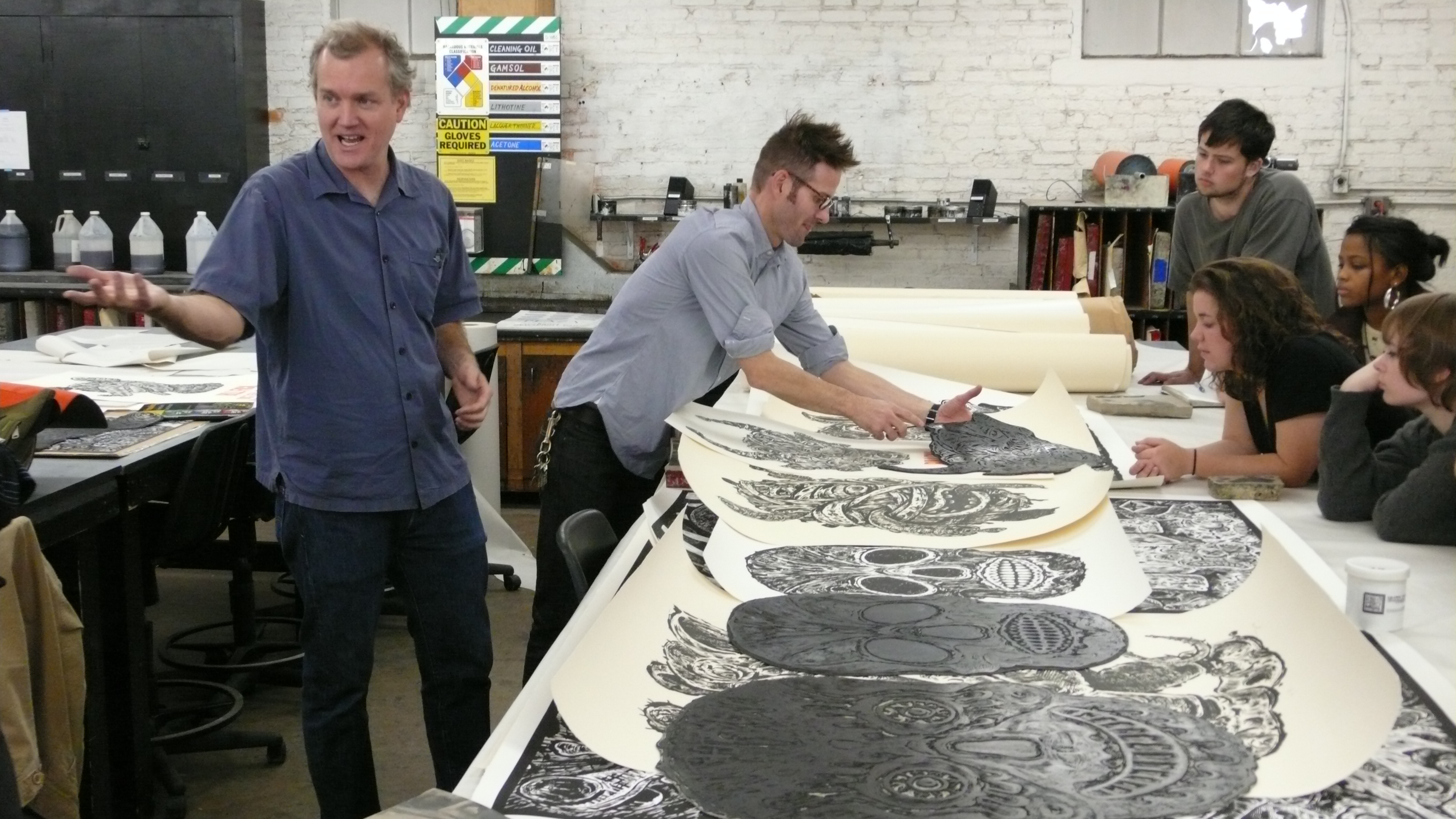
"Bill Fick at MICA" 2009

Bill Fick is a printmaker living and working in Durham, North Carolina. Fick is the director of Cockeyed Press, which specializes in the production of satirical linocut prints and book production. He is also a member of the Outlaw Printmakers. Fick, along with Beth Grabowski authored a book, Printmaking: A Complete Guide to Materials & Processes in 2009.

== Biography ==
Fick was born on October 19, 1963, in Lirik, Sumatra, Indonesia. His family moved to the United States when he was young and he received his B.A. from Duke University in 1986 and his M.F.A. from University of North Carolina-Greensboro in 1990.

== Artist and educator ==
Fick is the Lecturing Fellow of Art at Duke University. He has exhibited in several solo and group shows nationally and internationally including the Czech Republic, New Zealand, and Finland. In addition, throughout his career, Fick has acted as a visiting artist, artist in residence, and professor to several art schools across the country.

Fick's work can be found in the collections of the Fogg Art Museum, Cambridge, Massachusetts; The New York Public Library, New York City; and the Zimmerli Art Museum, Rutgers University. In 1993 Fick was awarded a National Endowment for the Arts Visual Artist Fellowship and in 1995 a North Carolina Arts Council Artist Fellowship.

Fick is associated with a movement within contemporary American printmaking known as "Outlaw Printmaking", a group that includes Tom Huck, Richard Mock, Dennis Mcnett, Sue Coe, Sean Starwars, Michael Barnes, and Cannonball Press.
