= Sean Starwars =

Printmaker

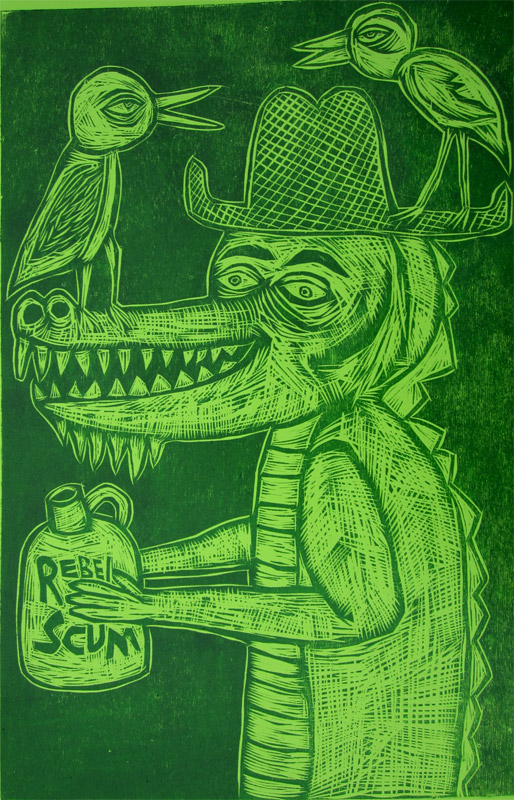
"Country Croc 2" from the "One Woodcut a Week" project

Sean Starwars is a printmaker living and working in Laurel, Mississippi. He is a relief printmaking artist specializing in woodcut printmaking. He is also a member of the Outlaw Printmakers.

== Biography ==
Sean Starwars BA from Old Dominion University in 1996 and his MFA from Louisiana State University in 1999. On his name "At first it amused him to have professionals address him as "Mr. Starwars," but he soon discovered it was also a great marketing tool for his woodcuts. "My real last name is pretty common," he said. "This is a way I could stand out."

== Career ==
Starwars is associated with a movement within contemporary American printmaking known as "Outlaw printmaking". The Outlaw Printmakers are a group that includes Tom Huck, Richard Mock, Dennis Mcnett, Sue Coe, Bill Fick, Michael Barnes, and Cannonball Press.

Starwars' original "Country Croc" woodcut was pictured as the example of the reductive approach to relief printmaking in Printmaking: A Complete Guide to Materials & Processes authored by Bill Fick and Beth Grabowski.

During 2011, Sean Starwars participated in a project called One Woodcut a Week in which he completed one 30"x20" woodcut a week for an entire year.
