= Animals, Property, and the Law =

1995 book by Gary L. Francione

- Goat outside slaughterhouse, PA
- Author: Gary Francione
- Cover artist: Sue Coe (1990)
- Series: Ethics and Action
- Subject: Jurisprudence, animal rights
- Publisher: Temple University Press
- Publication date: May 1995
- Publication place: United States
- Media type: Hardcover, paperback, Kindle edition
- Pages: 368 (1st edition, hardcover)
- ISBN: 978-1-56639-283-9 (1st edition, hardcover)
- Preceded by: Vivisection and Dissection in the Classroom: A Guide to Conscientious Objection (1992)
- Followed by: Rain Without Thunder: The Ideology of the Animal Rights Movement (1996)

Animals, Property, and the Law (1995) is a book by Gary Francione, Distinguished Professor of Law and Nicholas deB. Katzenbach Scholar of Law and Philosophy at Rutgers School of Law–Newark. The book was the first extensive jurisprudential treatment of animal rights.

== Synopsis ==
The book is divided into an introduction, which describes Francione's concept of "legal welfarism," followed by three parts: (1) "The Status of Animals as Property, (2) "A General Application of the Theory: Anticruelty Statutes," and (3) "A Specific Application of the Theory: The Regulation of Animal Experimenation." The epilogue is entitled, "An Alternative to Legal Welfarism?"

In part 1, Francione argues that nonhuman animals are the personal property, or chattel, of their owners, even if recognized as a special kind of property. As such, they cannot themselves possess legal rights, because they are the objects of the exercise of someone else's rights. Whenever the interests of an animal are balanced against the interests of the owner (assuming the animal is recognized as having interests), the owner's interests almost always prevail, no matter how trivial they might be. Francione compares the situation to the treatment of slaves in the United States in the 18th and 19th centuries, where legislation existed that ostensibly protected them, while the courts ignored that the institution of slavery rendered that protection largely meaningless.

He argues further that the United States Animal Welfare Act is an example of symbolic, as opposed to functional, legislation, relying on concepts described by John Dwyer in 1990. It is symbolic, he writes (quoting Dwyer), because it is an example of a law where "the legislature has failed to address the administrative and political constraints that will block implementation of the statute."

== Reception ==
Professor Priscilla Cohn gave the book a favorable review, writing "Francione makes us analyze our views on animals, cruelty, what sort of pain is 'necessary,' what kind of a society allows defenseless creatures to be shot, burned, prodded, beaten, etc. His explanations are always thoughtful, his analyses penetrating, his examples interesting and entertaining." Antonia Layard of Environmental Values was more critical, as she felt that Francione experienced difficulty when he "attempts to put something in its place, for he does not describe how Regan's theory of animal rights might be implemented in practice, a contribution most lawyers would expect him to make. In particular, Francione cites Regan to submit that animals should not have equal rights with humans, intertwining this with a statement that they do not have the same rights."

The Harvard Law Review was also critical, as they felt that the book was a "thoughtful, wide-ranged study" but that it "will do nothing to convert the confirmed speciesist".
