= Sierra Nevada University =

Defunct University near Lake Tahoe in Nevada, U.S.

Coordinates: 39.2444°N 119.9388°W

- Former name: Sierra Nevada College 1969-2020
- Motto: Wisdom, Responsibility, Freedom
- Type: Private university
- Active: 1969–2022
- President: Rob Valli
- Administrative staff: 24 full time faculty, 50 part time faculty
- Location: Incline Village, Nevada, United States
- Campus: Mountain Community
- Colors: Royal Blue and White
- Nickname: Eagles
- Sporting affiliations: NAIA
- Mascot: Eli (an American Eagle)
- Website: www.sierranevada.edu
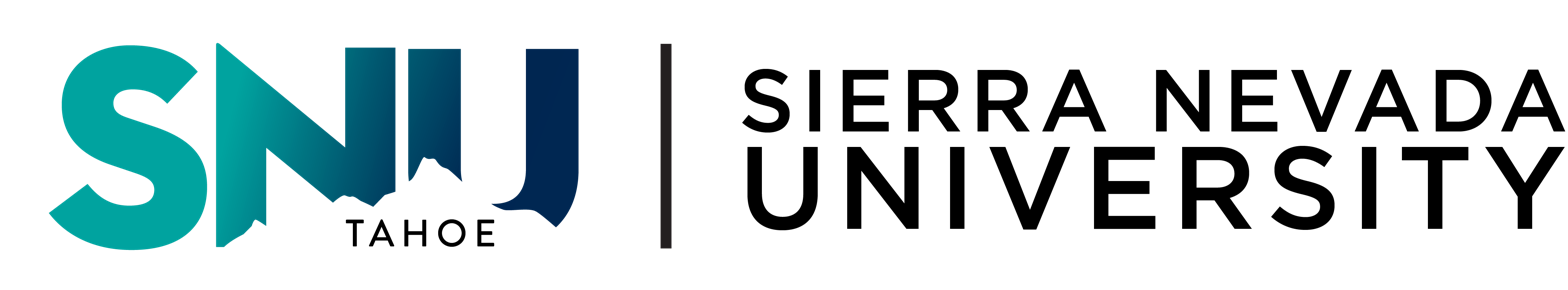

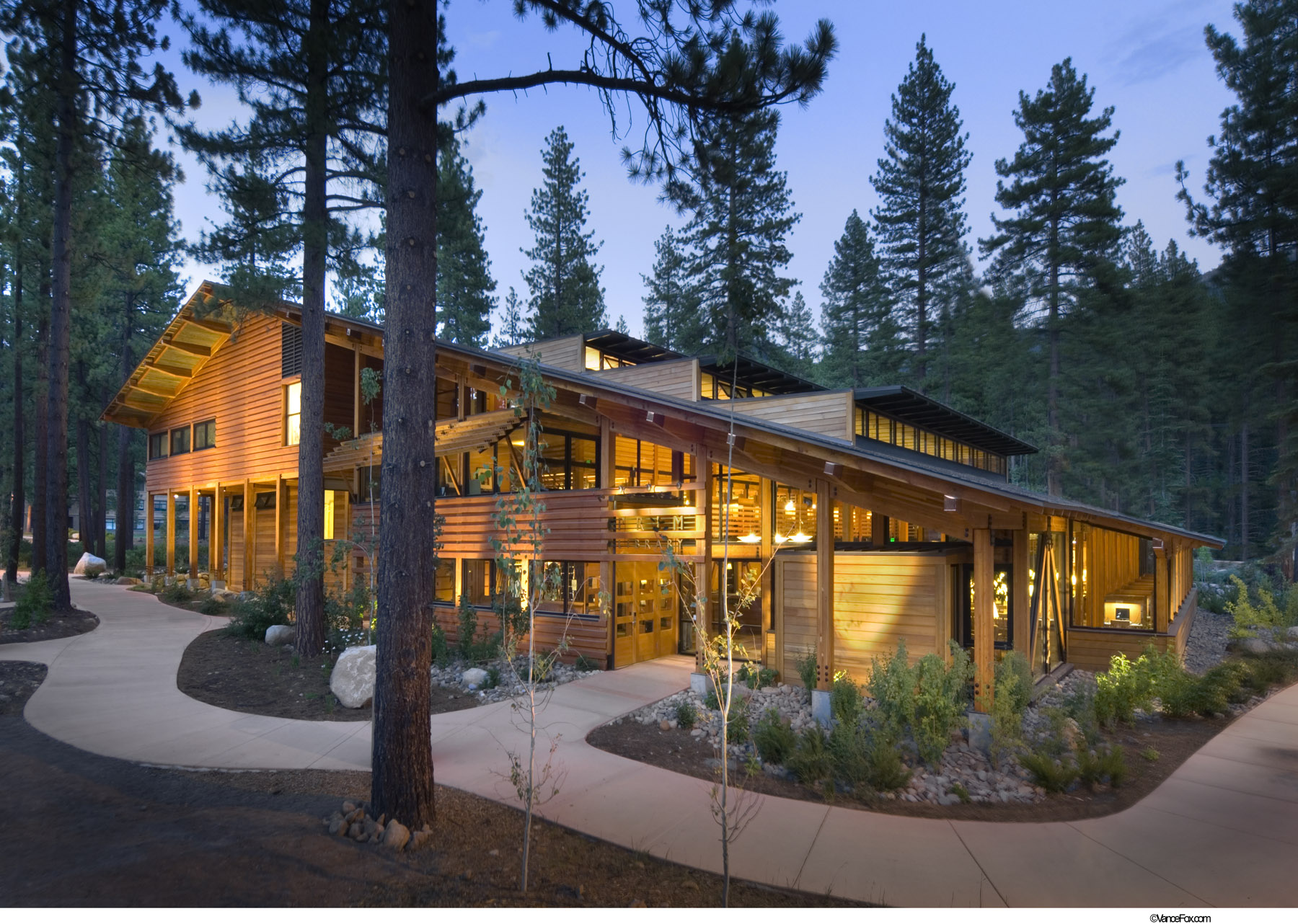
Prim Library, opened on September 9, 2004

Sierra Nevada University (SNU) was a private university in Incline Village, Nevada, in the Sierras. It was governed by a seven-member board of trustees who were locally elected. In 2022, it was announced that the school would no longer be independent and would be merged into the University of Nevada, Reno.

== History ==
Founded in 1969, Sierra Nevada College was accredited by the Northwest Commission on Colleges and Universities. Prior to 2020, the institution was known as Sierra Nevada College. In the summer of 2019, Dr. Ed Zschau became the interim president of Sierra Nevada University and, among other initiatives, spearheaded the change in the institution's name. It was announced in July 2021 that the Sierra Nevada University is being merged into the University of Nevada, Reno. Certain programs, courses and professors of Sierra Nevada University would be kept by the University of Nevada Reno. On July 21, 2022, the university formally ceased operations and became the Wayne L. Prim Campus at UNR. A teach-out process is occurring for SNU students who did not want to transfer to Reno, but otherwise enrollment of UNR students at the Lake Tahoe campus has been minimal, with zero students in 2023 and seven students in 2024.

== Academics ==
The Departments of Fine Arts, Humanities and Social Sciences, Business, and Science and Technology offered traditional majors as well as Interdisciplinary Studies programs. The Business department at SNU also offered Ski Business and Resort Management as a four-year degree. The teacher education program lead to Master of Arts in Teaching, Master of Arts in Administration and Masters in Education degrees as well as to teacher licensure in Nevada. The college also operated two low-residency, Masters of Fine Arts programs. Creative Writing and Interdisciplinary Arts MFA's used a low-residency format and individual mentoring to prepare artists and writers for professional and artistic success.

The MFA-IA program focused on site-specific and community practice, with a large part of each residency taking place off site at partner locations such as the Sagehen Creek Field Station.

SNU, in collaboration with UC Davis Tahoe Environmental Research Center (TERC), housed the Tahoe Center for Environmental Sciences, a facility conducting research on Lake Tahoe.

From 2016 to 2019, as part of an initiative to expand access to four-year degrees, SNU also operated extension centers on community college campuses. There were SNU Extension centers on the campus of Lake Tahoe Community College in South Lake Tahoe, Truckee Meadows Community College's Dandini Campus in Reno, Nevada. Each Extension Center offered degrees specific to demand on the campus where they are located, and included B.A. in Psychology, B.A. or B.S. in General Studies, a B.S. in Business Administration (B.S.B.A) in Entrepreneurship or Global Business Management.

=== Summer visiting artist workshops ===
Sierra Nevada University hosted an extensive program of Summer Visiting Artist Workshops which featured well-known artists from multiple disciplines. Artists such as printmaker Sean Starwars, and visual artist and experimental filmmaker Tim Guthrie were regular workshop leaders.

== Athletics ==
The Sierra Nevada athletic teams were called the Eagles. The university was a member of the National Association of Intercollegiate Athletics (NAIA), primarily competing in the California Pacific Conference (CalPac) from 2015 to 2016 (when the school joined the NAIA) to 2021–22.

Sierra Nevada competed in 13 intercollegiate athletic teams: Men's sports included alpine skiing, cross country, freeskiing, golf, lacrosse, snowboarding and soccer; while women's sports included alpine skiing, cross country, freeskiing, golf, snowboarding and soccer.

=== Skiing ===
The Eagles won many United States Collegiate Ski and Snowboard Association national championships in both men's and women's events.

== Notable faculty, past and present ==
- Laura McCullough – poet (Masters in Fine Arts Program)
- Suzanne Roberts – American poet, travel writer, and photographer (Creative Writing Faculty – Distinguished Writer-in-Residence 2011–2012)
- Carolee Schneeman – Experimental filmmaker (Visiting professor, 1994)
- Brian Turner – poet (Program Chair - Masters in Fine Arts in Creative Writing Program)
- Patricia Smith – poet (Creative Writing Faculty)
- Gayle Brandeis – author (Creative Writing Faculty - Distinguished Visiting Professor/Writer in Residence 2014–2015)

== Notable alumni ==
- Matea Ferk (born 1987) – Croatia Ski Team, Women's Alpine Skiing, 2006 and 2010 Winter Olympics.
- Philip "P.K." O'Neill (born 1951) – Republican member of the Nevada Assembly.
- Tea Palic (born 1991) – Croatia Ski Team, Women's Alpine Skiing, 2010 Winter Olympics.
