= Animal protectionism =

Position within animal rights theory

Animal protectionism is a position within animal rights theory that favors incremental change in pursuit of non-human animal interests. It is contrasted with abolitionism, the position that human beings have no moral right to use animals, and ought to have no legal right, no matter how the animals are treated.

Animal protectionists agree with abolitionists that the animal welfare model of animal protection—whereby animals may be used as food, clothing, entertainment and in experiments so long as their suffering is regulated—has failed ethically and politically, but argue that its philosophy can be reformulated. Robert Garner of the University of Leicester, a leading academic protectionist, argues that animal use may in some circumstances be justified, although it should be better regulated, and that the pursuit of better treatment and incremental change is consistent with holding an abolitionist position. Gary Francione, professor of law at Rutgers School of Law-Newark and a leading abolitionist, calls this approach "new welfarism". He regards it as counter-productive because it wrongly persuades the public that the animals they use are being treated kindly, and that continued use is therefore justifiable. Francione regards the abolitionist position as the only one that can properly be called animal rights.

== Arguments ==
One of the arguments put forward by abolitionists against protectionism is that small improvements in animal welfare serve to salve consciences by persuading the public that their use of animals is not unethical. Welfare reform can therefore be counter-productive. Abolitionists also argue that real reform is invariably unsuccessful because industries that depend on animal use will not implement change that harms their profit margin, that is, the property status of animals prohibits reform that will harm their owners' interests. For that reason, abolitionists argue it is the property status of animals that must be removed.

Robert Garner argues against this that welfare reform is not simply a staging post on the way to abolition but is in itself desirable. An approach that is based on the right of animals not to suffer could in theory be satisfied with a welfare system in which animal suffering, if not animal use, was minimized, although he concedes that this is unlikely. He also argues that Francione has not shown that improvements in welfare persuade the public that all is well. Rather, he argues that reform has the effect of raising public consciousness about the interests of animals.

== See also ==
- Animal rights
- Animal welfare
- List of animal rights advocates
- Tokugawa Tsunayoshi
