= Ericka Walker =

American artist and printmaker (born 1981)

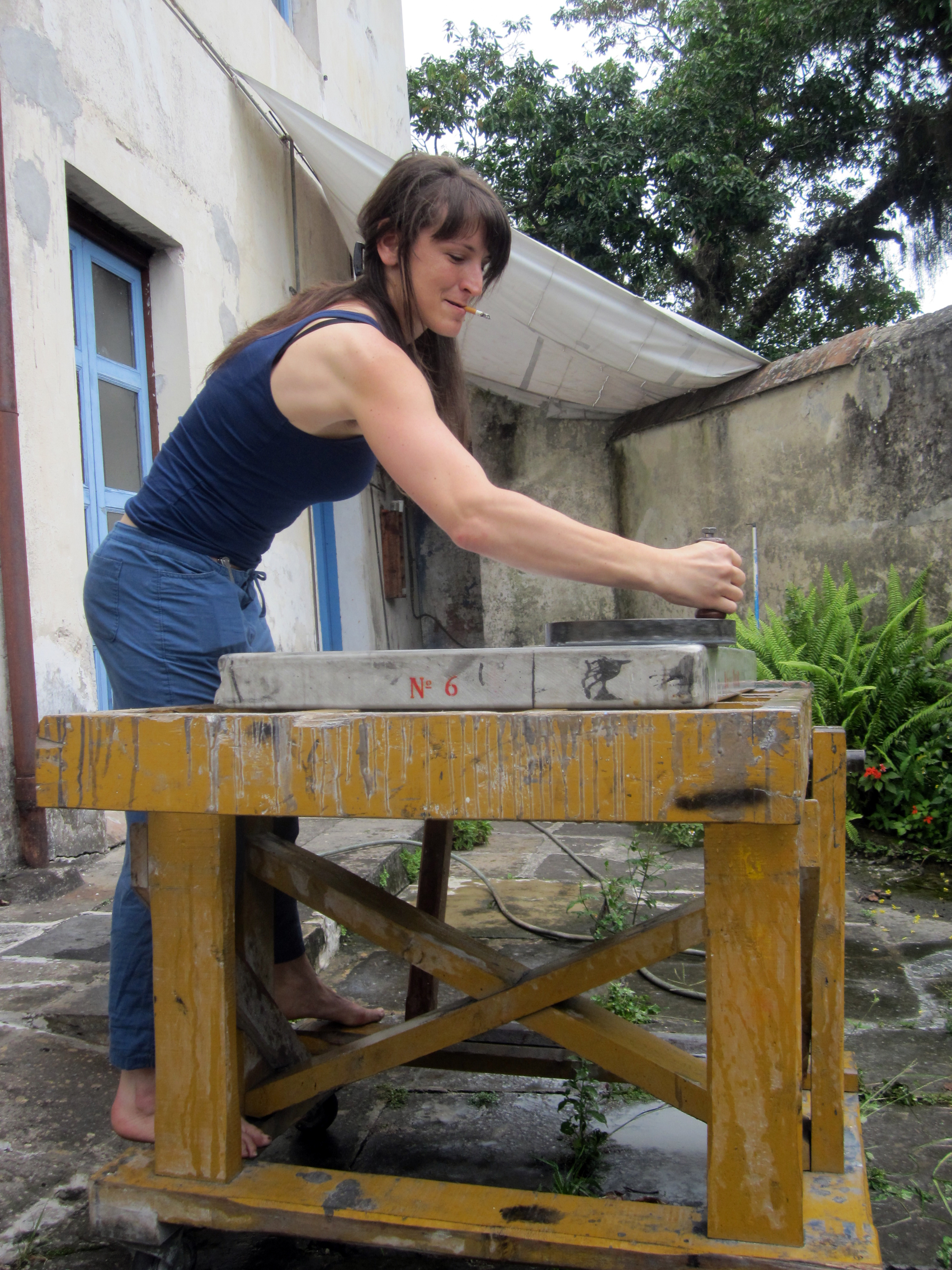
- Walker graining a lithography stone at an artist residency in Coatepec, Veracruz, 2012.
- Born: Ericka Louise Walker; June 16, 1981 (age 44); Hartford, Wisconsin, US
- Education: University of Wisconsin–Stevens Point, University of Wisconsin–Madison, University of Tennessee
- Website: erickawalker.com

Ericka Walker (born June 16, 1981 in Hartford, Wisconsin) is an American artist and printmaker. She lives and works in Halifax, Nova Scotia, Canada.

== Life and work ==
=== Education ===
Walker attended secondary school at Hartford Union High School from 1996-1999. She studied studio art at the University of Wisconsin–Stevens Point from 1999-2001 and the University of Wisconsin–Madison from 2002-2005, where she received a Bachelor of Science degree. She later earned a Master of Fine Arts degree from the University of Tennessee, where she trained from 2007-2010. Walker is a member of the Outlaw Printmakers.

=== Artwork ===
Walker is noted for using traditional and digital printmaking tools and techniques to design and print large-scale contemporary lithographs that emulate turn of the century propaganda posters. In his juror's statement for the Southern Printmaking Biennale V exhibition catalog, Matthew Rebholz asserted that her work reflects contentious U.S. foreign policy issues and the implications of endless occupation, while other critics have pointed to Walker's use of nostalgia as a means of questioning persistent domestic relationships between industry, agriculture, and mechanized warfare. In an exhibition review of Walker's work at Slugfest Gallery in Austin, TX, USA, critic Jason Urban suggests that, as opposed to clarifying any particular issues-based political agenda, the dystopic content of Walker's work instead extolls propaganda for its own sake, and critic Arthur Nodens similarly asserts that "Political stances or calls to action are elusive," and that Walker instead "appears more interested in [an] interaction with the tradition of nostalgic falsehoods, rallying points in discordant times." Reviewing a three-person exhibition that included Walker's lithographs at the Vernon Public Art Gallery in 2015, essayist Carolyn MacHardy states that "Walker's works simulate propaganda but they are not propaganda: it is difficult to identify the authority behind the work and it is not always clear what type of action the viewer is being goaded into." In her own artist statement Walker is quoted as saying that "[The work] points critically to both the violent and the bucolic - the guns and wars and tractors and engines of industry, and the language of national pride grafted to principles of duty, sacrifice, and honor - that have long been and remain its allies and infrastructure." Oversimplified directives and bold imagery - traditional tactics of visual propagandists meant to elicit automatic emotional allegiance to agitation or integration activities - are in Walker's work pitted against themselves to reveal a complex web of self-generated mythologies that continue to define contemporary visual articulations of labor, national pride, patriarchy, and patriotism.

=== Exhibitions and collections ===
Walker's work has been included in international biennials, triennials, group, and solo exhibitions at venues including the Biennale internationale d'estampe contemporaine de Trois-Rivières (2025 and 2015), the Knoxville Museum of Art (2023), the Milwaukee Art Museum (2022 and 2019), the Kelowna Art Gallery (2021), the Art Gallery of Nova Scotia (2019), the Okanagan Print Triennale (2018 and 2012), The Reach Gallery Museum (2017), SNAP Gallery (2017), the inaugural SPI Self Publishers Invitational exhibition at New York Print Week (2016), The 7th Duoro Biennial (2014), The Boston Printmakers North American Print Biennial (2013), The International Print Triennial-Kraków (2013), The Oso Bay Biennial XVII (2012), The Sanbao Printmaking Biennial (2011), The Southern Printmaking Biennial V (2010), and The Pacific States Biennial National Print Exhibition (2010).

Her work is housed in multiple public collections, including the collections of the Milwaukee Art Museum, the Denver Art Museum, the Chazen Museum of Art, the Library of Congress, the Hilliard Art Museum, the Art Gallery of Nova Scotia, the Jingdezhen Ceramic Institute, the Leifur Eiriksson Foundation, the Museum of Texas Tech University, and the Southern Graphics Council International Print Archive.

=== Academic career ===
Walker served as a Teaching Associate and Teaching Assistant at the University of Tennessee from 2007-2010 and as a Visiting Assistant Professor of Art at Wichita State University from 2010-2011. She is currently an Associate Professor of Art in Fine Arts at NSCAD University.
