= Sue Coe =

British artist

- Born: 21 February 1951 (age 75); Tamworth, Staffordshire, England
- Education: Chelsea College of Art, Royal College of Art
- Known for: Prints, paintings, illustrations, social protest art, animal rights activist

Sue Coe (born 21 February 1951) is an English artist and illustrator working primarily in drawing, printmaking, and in the form of illustrated books and comics. Her work is in the tradition of social protest art and is highly political. Coe's work often includes animal rights commentary, though she also creates work that centralizes the rights of marginalized peoples and criticizes capitalism. Her commentary on political events and social injustice are published in newspapers, magazines and books. Her work has been shown internationally in both solo and group exhibitions and has been collected by various international museums. She lives in Upstate New York.

== Biography ==
Coe was born 21 February 1951 to a working class family in Tamworth, Staffordshire, England. Her family later moved to London, Hersham, and Walton-on-Thames. In Hersham, she lived near a slaughterhouse and developed a passion to stop cruelty to animals. According to Coe, her family lived directly behind a hog farm and were continually exposed to the stench from the slaughterhouse and screams from the animals.

At age 16, Coe started studying at Chelsea College of Arts, where she graduated with a B.A. degree in 1970 at the age of 18. Coe went on to study graphic design at Royal College of Art in London from 1970–1973. However, she was too young to attend and lied about her age on the college application. After she received her M.A. degree from Royal College of Art, Coe moved to New York City, where she lived between 1972 and 2001. Coe had been an art teacher, and decided to fully dedicated herself to art making by 1978. In 2013 she was a visiting artist at Parsons School of Design and taught about social awareness in art.

== Works ==
Coe is a graphic artist and visual essayist. Though she primarily works in printmaking and illustration, she also practices in other visual media, including painting. Coe's paintings and prints are auctioned as fundraisers for a variety of progressive causes. Since 1998, she has sold prints to benefit animal rights organizations. Her influences include the works of Chaïm Soutine and José Guadalupe Posada, Käthe Kollwitz, Francisco Goya, and Rembrandt.

Coe uses books and visual essays to explore various social topics including: factory farming, meat packing, apartheid, sweatshops, prison-industrial complex, AIDS, and war. Coe cites activists as the primary audience for her work. As an illustrator, she is a frequent contributor to World War 3 Illustrated, and has seen her work published in The Progressive, Mother Jones, Blab, The New York Times, The New Yorker, Time Magazine, Newsweek The Nation and other periodicals. One of her illustrations was used on the cover of the book, Animals, Property, and the Law (1995) by Gary Francione, and her artwork is also featured in the animal rights movie, Earthlings.

Coe's work is coupled to her activism, though the artist recoils from the "political artist" label. Nevertheless, Coe's works have notable political messages. "Police State," an exhibition organized by the Anderson Gallery at Virginia Commonwealth University, showcased works illustrating Coe's anti-war sentiments and critiques of international governments. Among the works included were "Your Class Enemy (The Great Miners Strike)," "England is a Bitch," and a number of Coe's New York Times illustrations. Coe also expressed anti-war sentiments during Desert Storm through an illustration published in Entertainment Weekly.

The artist's subjects are the victimized. She often depicts harsh realities, and her subjects are largely animals and humans oppressed by social and political forces beyond their control. For example, Coe and collaborator Holly Metz explore apartheid and the murder of Steve Biko in How to Commit Suicide in South Africa, a visual essay originally published by Raw Books & Graphics in 1983. Sheep of Fools (2005), a horrific look at the conditions of sheep trade, and Dead Meat (1996), a journalistic piece illustrating the brutality of slaughterhouses throughout North America, are both longer narrative investigations into animal cruelty.

=== Awards ===
Coe was elected into the National Academy of Design, as an Associate Academician in 1993, and became a full Academician by 1994. PETA progress awards named Sheep of Fools, Coe's collaboration with Judy Brody, Nonfiction Book of the Year in 2005. In 2013, Dickinson College honored Coe with the Dickinson College Arts Award, in recognition as an influential cultural figure in the United States. She was awarded the 2015 Lifetime Achievement in the Visual Arts award from Women's Caucus for Art, for her dedication to art and activism. In 2017, Coe was awarded the SGCI Lifetime Achievement award in Printmaking from Southern Graphics Council International (SGCI).

=== Museum collections ===
Coe's work is in the collections of various international museums including: The Museum of Modern Art (MoMA), Whitney Museum of American Art, The Metropolitan Museum of Art, Smithsonian American Art Museum, Birmingham Museum of Art, Art Institute of Chicago, The Museum of Fine Arts, Houston, Cooper-Hewitt Museum, Stedelijk Museum Amsterdam, Pennsylvania Academy of the Fine Arts, Harvard Art Museums, Brooklyn Museum, Walker Art Center, and others.

=== Criticism ===
Coe has been criticized by writers Cary Wolfe and Steven Baker for "audience positioning" and using "stylistic sentimentality" to incite outrage and illicit specific responses from viewers. She has also been criticized for using stereotypes, thereby creating one-dimensional representations of depicted victims. Coe is also a harsh critic of herself, retroactively condemning X, her graphic companion to Malcolm X's autobiography for the way it iconized him.

== See also ==
- List of animal rights advocates

== Select exhibitions ==
=== Solo ===
- 2016 – “’The AIDS Suite, HIV-Positive Women in Prison and Other Works by Artist/Activist Sue Coe” at Cushing/Whitney Medical Library at Yale University
- 2014 – "Allied Against AIDS: Sue Coe's AIDS Portfolio" work from 1994 at Pomona College Museum of Art (PCMA) at Pomona College
- 2007 – "Sue Coe: Graphic Witness" at Pacific Northwest College of Art
- 2002 – "Commitment to the Struggle: The Art of Sue Coe" at Bell Gallery at Brown University
- 1994 – "Directions: Sue Coe" at Hirshhorn Museum and Sculpture Garden

=== Group ===
- 2017 – ""All Good Art is Political - the work of Käthe Kollwitz and Sue Coe" at Galerie St. Etienne in New York City
- 2017 – "Expression and Repression Exhibition" a group exhibition at Kennedy Museum of Art
- 2017 – “Sharp-Tongued Figuration” a group exhibition at Stedman Gallery on the Rutgers-Camden Center for the Arts at Rutgers University–Camden
- 2009 – "The 184th Annual Exhibition of Contemporary American Art" at National Academy Museum, New York City
- 2008 – "Make Art/Stop AIDS" a group exhibition at Fowler Museum at UCLA
- 1997 – "On the Edge: Contemporary Art From the Werner and Elaine Dannheisser Collection", Museum of Modern Art (MoMA), New York City

== Selected bibliography ==
- How to Commit Suicide in South Africa (with Holly Metz). (1984) Random House. ISBN 0-394-62024-0
- X (The Life and Times of Malcolm X) (with Judith Moore). (1986) RAW Books. ISBN 1-56584-032-1
- Police State (exhibition catalog). (1987). Anderson Gallery. ISBN 978-0935519075
- Meat: Animals and Industry (with Mandy Coe). (1991) Gallerie Publications. ISBN 0-9693361-6-0
- Dead Meat. (1996) Four Walls Eight Windows. ISBN 1-56858-041-X
- Pit's Letter. (2000) Four Walls Eight Windows. ISBN 1-56858-163-7
- Bully!: Master of the Global Merry-Go-Round (with Judith Brody). (2004) Four Walls Eight Windows. ISBN 1-56858-323-0
- Sheep of Fools (with Judith Brody). (2005) Fantagraphics Books. ISBN 1-56097-660-8
- Cruel: Bearing Witness to Animal Exploitation. (2012) OR Books. ISBN 978-1-935928-72-0
- The Ghosts of our Meat (with Stephen Eisenman (Author), Phillip Earenfight (Editor)). (2014) ISBN 9780982615669
- The Animals' Vegan Manifesto. (2017) OR Books. ISBN 978-1-682190-74-6
- Zooicide - Seeing Cruelty, Demanding Abolition. (2018) AK Press. ISBN 978-1-849352-86-4
