= Abolitionism (animal rights) =

Opposition to all animal use by humans

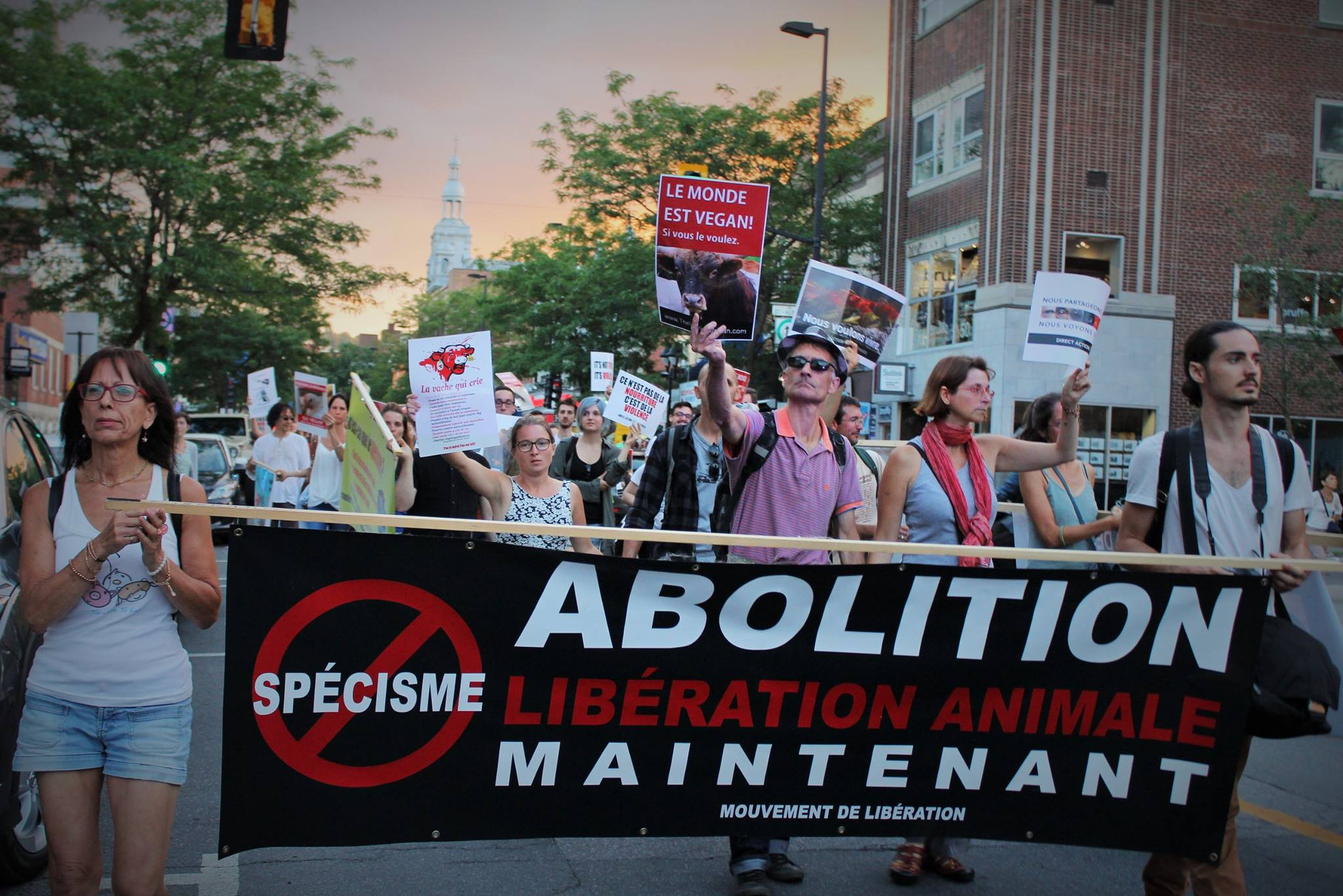
2015 anti-speciesism protest by abolitionists in Montreal

Abolitionism or abolitionist veganism is the animal rights based opposition to all animal use by humans. Abolitionism intends to eliminate all forms of animal use by maintaining that all sentient beings, humans or nonhumans, share a basic right not to be treated as properties or objects. Abolitionists emphasize that the production of animal products requires treating animals as property or resources, and that animal products are not necessary for human health in modern societies. Abolitionists believe that everyone who can live vegan is therefore morally obligated to be vegan.

Abolitionists disagree on the strategy that must be used to achieve their goal. While some abolitionists, like Gary L. Francione, professor of law, argue that abolitionists should create awareness about the benefits of veganism through creative and nonviolent education (by also pointing to health and environmental benefits) and inform people that veganism is a moral imperative, others such as Tom Regan believe that abolitionists should seek to stop animal exploitation in society, and fight for this goal through political advocacy, without using the environmental or health arguments. Abolitionists such as Steven Best and David Nibert argue, respectively, that embracing alliance politics and militant direct action for change (including civil disobedience, mass confrontation, etc), and transcending capitalism are integral to ending animal exploitation.

Abolitionists generally oppose movements that seek to make animal use more humane or to abolish specific forms of animal use, since they believe this undermines the movement to abolish all forms of animal use. The objective is to secure a moral and legal paradigm shift, whereby animals are no longer regarded as things to be owned and used. The American philosopher Tom Regan writes that abolitionists want empty cages, not bigger ones. This is contrasted with animal welfare, which seeks incremental reform, and animal protectionism, which seeks to combine the first principles of abolitionism with an incremental approach, but which is regarded by some abolitionists as another form of welfarism or "New Welfarism".

== Concepts ==
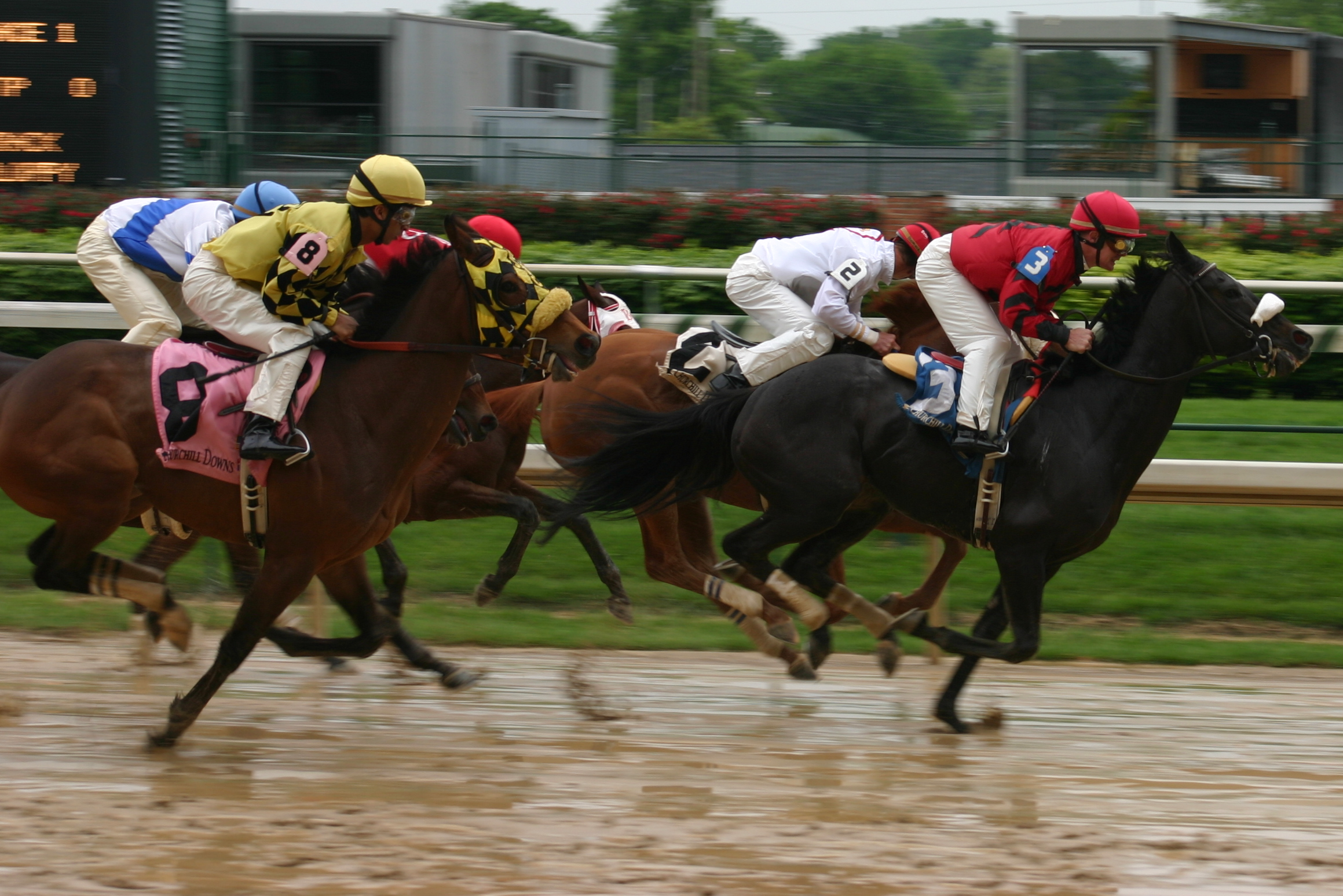
Abolitionists oppose horse racing as they believe it is a form of animal exploitation.

The word relates to the historical term abolitionism—a social movement to end slavery or human ownership of other humans. Based on the way of evaluating welfare reforms, abolitionists can be either radical or pragmatic. While the former maintain that welfare reforms can only be dubiously described as moral improvements, the latter consider welfare reforms as moral improvements even when the conditions they permit are unjust.

Gary L. Francione, professor of law and philosophy at Rutgers School of Law–Newark, argues from the abolitionist perspective that self-described animal-rights groups who pursue welfare concerns, such as People for the Ethical Treatment of Animals, risk making the public feel comfortable about its use of animals. He calls such groups the "new welfarists", arguing that, though their aim is an end to animal use, the reforms they pursue are indistinguishable from reforms agreeable to traditional welfarists, who he says have no interest in abolishing animal use. He argues that reform campaigns entrench the property status of animals, and validate the view that animals simply need to be treated better. Instead, he writes, the public's view that animals can be used and consumed ought to be challenged. His position is that this should be done by promoting ethical veganism. Others think that this should be done by creating public debate in society.

Philosopher Steven Best of the University of Texas at El Paso has been critical of Francione for his denunciation of militant direct actions carried out by the underground animal liberation movement and organizations like the Animal Liberation Front, which Best compares favorably to the "nineteenth-century-abolitionist movement" to end slavery, and also for placing the onus on individual consumers rather than powerful institutions such as corporations, the state and the mass media along with ignoring the "constraints imposed by poverty, class, and social conditioning." In this, he says that Francione "exculpates capitalism" and fails to "articulate a structural theory of oppression." The "vague, elitist, asocial 'vegan education' approach," Best argues, is no substitute for "direct action, mass confrontation, civil disobedience, alliance politics, and struggle for radical change."

Sociologist David Nibert of Wittenberg University argues that attempting to create a vegan world under global capitalism is unrealistic given that "tens of millions of animals are tortured and brutally killed every year to produce profits for twenty-first century elites, who hold investments in the corporate equivalents of Genghis Khan" and that any real and meaningful change will only come by transcending capitalism. He writes that the contemporary entrenchment of capitalism and continued exploitation of animals by human civilization dovetail into the ongoing expansion of what he describes as the animal–industrial complex, with the number of CAFOs and the animals to fill them dramatically increasing, along with growing numbers of humans consuming animal products. He rhetorically asks, how can one hope to create some consumer base for this new vegan world when over a billion people live on less than a dollar a day? Nibert acknowledges that post-capitalism on its own will not automatically end animal exploitation or bring about a more just world, but that it is a "necessary precondition" for such changes.

New welfarists argue that there is no logical or practical contradiction between abolitionism and "welfarism". Welfarists think that they can be working toward abolition, but by gradual steps, pragmatically taking into account what most people can be realistically persuaded to do in the short as well as the long term, and reduce animal suffering as it is most urgent to relieve. People for the Ethical Treatment of Animals, for example, in addition to promoting local improvements in the treatment of animals, promote vegetarianism. Although some people believe that changing the legal status of nonhuman sentient beings is a first step in abolishing ownership or mistreatment, others argue that this will not succeed if the consuming public has not already begun to reduce or eliminate its exploitation of animals for food.

== Personhood ==
In 1992, Switzerland amended its constitution to recognize animals as beings and not things. The dignity of animals is also protected in Switzerland.

New Zealand granted basic rights to five great ape species in 1999. Their use is now forbidden in research, testing or teaching.

Germany added animal welfare in a 2002 amendment to its constitution, becoming the first European Union member to do so.

In 2007, the parliament of the Balearic Islands, an autonomous province of Spain, passed the world's first legislation granting legal rights to all great apes.

In 2013, India officially recognized dolphins as non-human persons.

In 2014, France revised the legal status of animals from movable property to sentient beings.

In 2015, the province of Quebec in Canada adopted the Animal Welfare and Safety Act, which gave animals the legal status of "sentient beings with biological needs".

== See also ==
- Animal liberationist
- Animal rights
- List of animal rights advocates
