= Richard Mock =

American painter

- Richard Mock's American Voter linocut
- Born: 1944; Long Beach, California, U.S.
- Died: July 28, 2006 (aged 61–62)
- Education: University of Michigan
- Known for: Linocut art

Richard Mock (1944 – July 28, 2006) was a printmaker, painter, sculptor, and editorial cartoonist. Mock was best known for his linocut illustrations that appeared on the Op-Ed page of The New York Times from 1980 through 1996.

Born in 1944 in Long Beach, California, Mock earned his bachelor's degree, studying lithography and block printing, at the University of Michigan. Settling in New York City in 1968, Mock had exhibitions at 112 Greene Street, The Whitney (in 1973), Exit Art, and his most recent show at the Sideshow Gallery in Brooklyn. In addition, Mock's art frequently appeared on the covers of the magazines Fifth Estate, Alternative Press Review and Anarchy: A Journal of Desire Armed. His work has been cited as an influence by a number of contemporary American printmakers, among them Tom Huck and Bill Fick. Huck and Fick are both members of a group of artists known as the "Outlaw Printmakers", which as a collective unit cite Mock's work as one of its main influences.

Mock was named the official portrait painter of the 1980 Olympics in Lake Placid, New York.

Mock died on July 28, 2006, after a long illness.
