= Gary L. Francione =

American legal scholar (born 1954)

Gary Francione
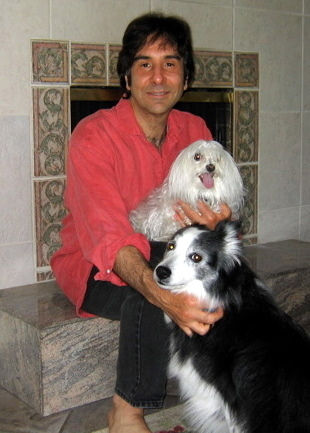
- Francione with two of his dog companions
- Born: May 1954 (age 72); United States
- Education: BA in philosophy (University of Rochester); MA in philosophy and JD (University of Virginia)
- Occupations: Distinguished Professor of Law and Nicholas deB. Katzenbach Scholar of Law & Philosophy, Rutgers School of Law–Newark
- Known for: Animal rights advocacy, abolitionism
- Spouse: Anna E. Charlton
- Website: AbolitionistApproach.com; HowDoIGoVegan.com

Gary Lawrence Francione (born May 1954) is an American academic in the fields of law and philosophy. He is Board of Governors Professor of Law and Katzenbach Scholar of Law and Philosophy at Rutgers University in New Jersey. He is also a visiting professor of philosophy at the University of Lincoln (UK) and honorary professor of philosophy at the University of East Anglia (UK). He is the author of numerous books and articles on animal ethics.

== Biography ==
Francione graduated with a BA in philosophy from the University of Rochester, where he was awarded the Phi Beta Kappa O'Hearn Scholarship, allowing him to pursue graduate study in philosophy in the UK. He received his MA in philosophy and his JD from the University of Virginia, where he was articles editor of the Virginia Law Review. After graduation, he clerked for Judge Albert Tate, Jr., U.S. Court of Appeals for the Fifth Circuit, and for Justice Sandra Day O'Connor of the U.S. Supreme Court.

After practicing law at the New York firm Cravath, Swaine & Moore, he joined the faculty at the University of Pennsylvania Law School in 1984, and received tenure in 1987. He began to teach animal rights theory as part of his course in jurisprudence in 1985. In 1989, he joined the Rutgers faculty, and in 1990, he and his colleague Anna E. Charlton started the Rutgers Animal Rights Law Project, in which law students were awarded academic credit for working on actual cases involving animals. Francione and Charlton closed the clinic in 2000, but continue to teach courses in animal rights theory, animals and the law, and human rights and animal rights. Francione also teaches criminal law, criminal procedure, and legal philosophy. In 1989, Francione taught the first course in an American law school on animal rights and the law.

Francione has been a professor at Rutgers since at least 1995, when The New York Times reported that the Rutgers' Animal Rights Law Center, the only one in the United States, was receiving 200 calls a week, and that Francione was losing "well over half the lawsuits the clinic brings", as they were taking a strict abolitionist approach.

== Animal rights theory ==
Francione is known for his work on animal rights theory, and in 1989, was the first academic to teach it in an American law school. His work has focused on three issues: the property status of animals, the differences between animal rights and animal welfare, and a theory of animal rights based on sentience alone, rather than on any other cognitive characteristics.

He is a pioneer of the abolitionist theory of animal rights, arguing that animal welfare regulation is theoretically and practically unsound, serving only to prolong the status of animals as property by making the public feel comfortable about using them. He argues that non-human animals require only one right, the right not to be regarded as property, and that veganism—the rejection of the use of animals as mere resources—is the moral baseline of the animal rights movement. He rejects all forms of violence, arguing that the animal rights movement is the logical progression of the peace movement, seeking to take it one step further by ending conflict between human and non-human animals, and by treating animals as ends in themselves.

Francione is the author or co-author of several books about animal rights, including Animals, Property, and the Law (1995), Rain Without Thunder: The Ideology of the Animal Rights Movement (1996), Animals as Persons (2008), and The Animal Rights Debate: Abolition or Regulation? (2010, with Robert Garner). "He has also written in the areas of copyright, patent law, and law and science".

=== Property status of animals ===
In Animals, Property, and the Law (1995), Francione argues that because animals are the property of humans, laws that supposedly require their "humane" treatment and prohibit the infliction of "unnecessary" harm do not provide a significant level of protection for animal interests. For the most part, these laws and regulations require only that animals receive that level of protection that is required for their use as human property. Animals only have value as commodities and their interests do not matter in any moral sense. As a result, despite having laws that supposedly protect them, Francione contends that we treat animals in ways that would be regarded as torture if humans were the ones being used. He argues that we could choose to provide some greater measure of protection to animals even if they were to remain our property, but only up until the point where it becomes too costly for us to continue. Legal, social, and economic forces militate strongly against recognizing animal interests unless there is an economic benefit to humans.

=== Comparison of animal rights and animal welfare ===
In Rain Without Thunder: The Ideology of the Animal Rights Movement (1996), Francione argues that there are significant theoretical and practical differences between animal rights, which he maintains requires the abolition of animal exploitation, and animal welfare, which seeks to regulate exploitation to make it more humane. Francione contends that the theoretical difference between these two approaches is obvious. The abolitionist position is that we cannot justify our use of nonhumans however "humanely" we treat animals; the regulationist position is that animal use is justifiable and that only issues of treatment are relevant.

Francione describes as "new welfarists" those who claim to support animal rights, but who support animal welfare regulation as the primary way to achieve incremental recognition of the inherent value of nonhumans. He argues that there is no factual support for this position because not only do regulations seldom if ever go beyond treating animals as economic commodities with only extrinsic value, but the perception that regulation has improved the "humane" treatment of animals may very well facilitate continued and increased exploitation by making the public feel more comfortable about its consumption of animal products.

A central tenet of Francione's philosophy is that the most important form of incremental change within the abolitionist framework is veganism. Francione has also long argued that the animal rights movement is the logical extension of the peace movement and should embrace a non-violent approach. He maintains that an abolitionist/vegan movement is truly radical and that violence is reactionary.

=== Relevance of sentience ===
In his Introduction to Animal Rights: Your Child or the Dog? (2000), Francione argues that a theory of abolition should not require that animals have any cognitive characteristic beyond sentience to be full members of the moral community, entitled to the basic, pre-legal right not to be the property of humans. He rejects the position that animals have to have humanlike cognitive characteristics, such as reflective self-awareness, language ability, or preference autonomy in order to have the right not to be used by humans as resources. Francione derives this right from the principle of equal consideration in that he maintains that if animals are property, their interests can never receive equal consideration.

As part of this discussion, Francione identifies what he calls our "moral schizophrenia" when it comes to nonhumans. On the one hand, we say that we take animal interests seriously. Francione points to the fact that many of us even live with nonhuman companions whom we regard as members of our families and whose personhood—their status as beings with intrinsic moral value—we do not doubt for a second. On the other hand, because animals are property, they remain things that have no value other than what we choose to accord them and whose interests we protect only when it provides a benefit—usually economic—to do so. According to Francione, if animals are going to matter morally and not be things, we cannot treat them as property. Francione debated the sentience of plants with Michael Marder in a debate organized by Columbia University Press.

=== Animal rights movement ===
Francione opposes violence in the struggle for animal rights. He has been criticized for this stance by Steven Best, who refers to those in the movement who reject violence as "Franciombes" and supports more permissive attitudes towards property damage and violence.

=== Views on transgender people ===
Francione has long maintained that human rights and animal rights are inextricably intertwined and has promoted feminism. He is of the view that gender ideology, which he defines as the view that gender identity can trump biological sex and serve as the basis for claims that he sees as harmful to women, is misogynistic. He says that trans people should not suffer discrimination in the distribution of social goods because they are trans but identifies as gender critical. He opposes transgender women having access to women's private spaces and sports teams. He has organized and participated in events in which transgender rights are discussed at the Oxford Literary Festival.

== Personal life ==
His wife, Anna E. Charlton, is an adjunct professor of law at Rutgers University, is active in the same field, and has co-authored several publications with Francione. In 2015, Gary Francione was involved in a multimillion-dollar tax dispute with the Internal Revenue Service (IRS). As of 2017, they live with six dogs, calling them "non-human refugees" who share his home—four suffered cruelty at the hands of past owners.

== Bibliography ==
- Why Veganism Matters: The Moral Value of Animals. New York: Columbia University Press, 2020. ISBN 978-0-231-19961-2
- With Anna Charlton. Advocate for Animals! An Abolitionist Vegan Handbook. Exempla Press, 2017. ISBN 978-0-9967192-7-8
- Animal Rights: The Abolitionist Approach. Co-Authored with Anna E. Charlton. Exempla Press, 2015. ISBN 978-0-9967192-3-0
- Eat Like You Care: An Examination of the Morality of Eating Animals. Exempla Press, 2013. ISBN 978-1-492-38651-3.
- With Robert Garner. The Animal Rights Debate: Abolition or Regulation? Columbia University Press, 2010. ISBN 978-0-231-14955-6
- "Animal Welfare and the Moral Value of Nonhuman Animals." Law, Culture and the Humanities 6(1), 2009: 24–36.
- Animals As Persons: Essays on the Abolition of Animal Exploitation. Columbia University Press, 2008. ISBN 978-0-231-13950-2
- "Taking Sentience Seriously." Journal of Animal Law & Ethics 1, 2006, p. 1.
- "Animal Rights Theory and Utilitarianism: Relative Normative Guidance." Between the Species 3, 2003.
- Introduction to Animal Rights: Your Child or the Dog? Philadelphia: Temple University Press, 2000. ISBN 1-56639-692-1
- Rain Without Thunder: The Ideology of the Animal Rights Movement. Philadelphia: Temple University Press, 1996. ISBN 1-56639-461-9. Reprinted 2007 with corrections. ISBN 1-56639-460-0
- Animals, Property, and the Law. Philadelphia: Temple University Press, 1995. ISBN 1-56639-284-5
- "Personhood, Property and Legal Competence, in Paola Cavalieri & Peter Singer (eds.), The Great Ape Project. New York: St. Martin's Griffin, 1993, pp. 248–257.
- With Anna E. Charlton. Vivisection and Dissection in the Classroom: A Guide to Conscientious Objection. Jenkintown, Pa.: American Anti-Vivisection Society, 1992.

== See also ==
- List of animal rights advocates
- List of law clerks for the eighth seat of the Supreme Court of the United States
- List of vegans
- Timeline of animal welfare and rights
