= Tom Huck =

American printmaker (born 1971)

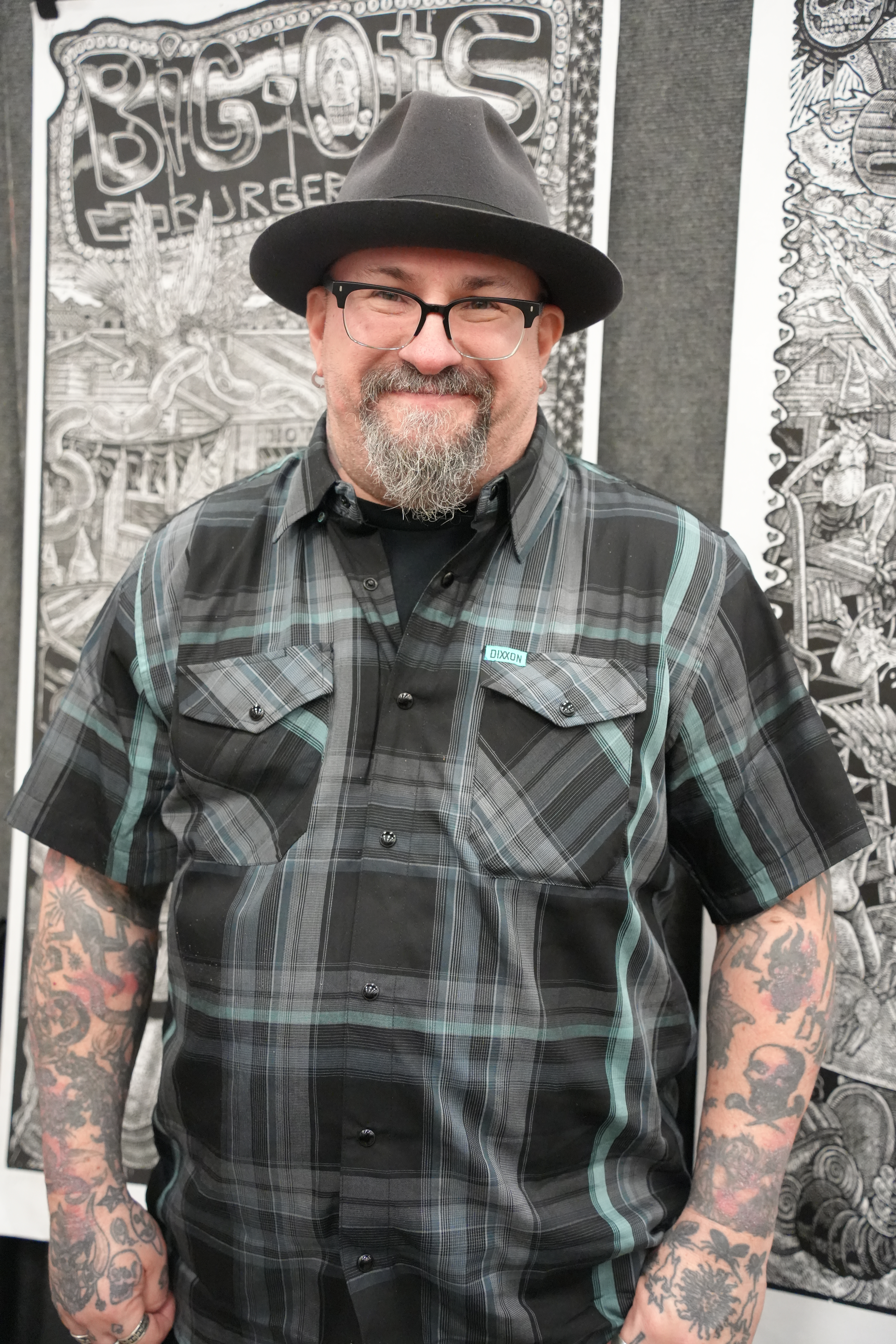
- Huck at SXSW 2025
- Born: Thomas Andrew Huck; December 9, 1971 (age 54); Farmington, Missouri, USA
- Education: Southern Illinois University at Carbondale, Washington University in St. Louis,
- Movement: Outlaw Printmakers
- Awards: Pollock Krasner Foundation Grant 2011
- Website: www.evilprints.com

Tom Huck, a.k.a. Hück or Tom Hück (born 1971), is an American artist best known for his large-scale satirical imagery that lampoons contemporary rural Midwestern culture. His technique and style has been distilled through study and response to centuries of Western Art History, particularly Northern European woodcuts. As described in the journal Art in Print, Huck's "elaborate compositions roil with bawdy images of sex, gluttony and violence, delivered in intricately-carved woodcuts of monumental scale that reference his art historical heroes: printmakers from Master ES to Max Beckmann.". His process is laborious and intricate; some of his works have required years to complete. Throughout his career, Huck has remained independent, finding critical and financial success on his own terms. He works from his "Spiderhole Studio/Evil Prints workshop in the Saint Louis, Missouri area, with a separate gallery downtown called Grafik House. He encourages other artists to attain woodcut mastery through his yearly woodcut "bootcamps" held at the workshop.

== Work ==
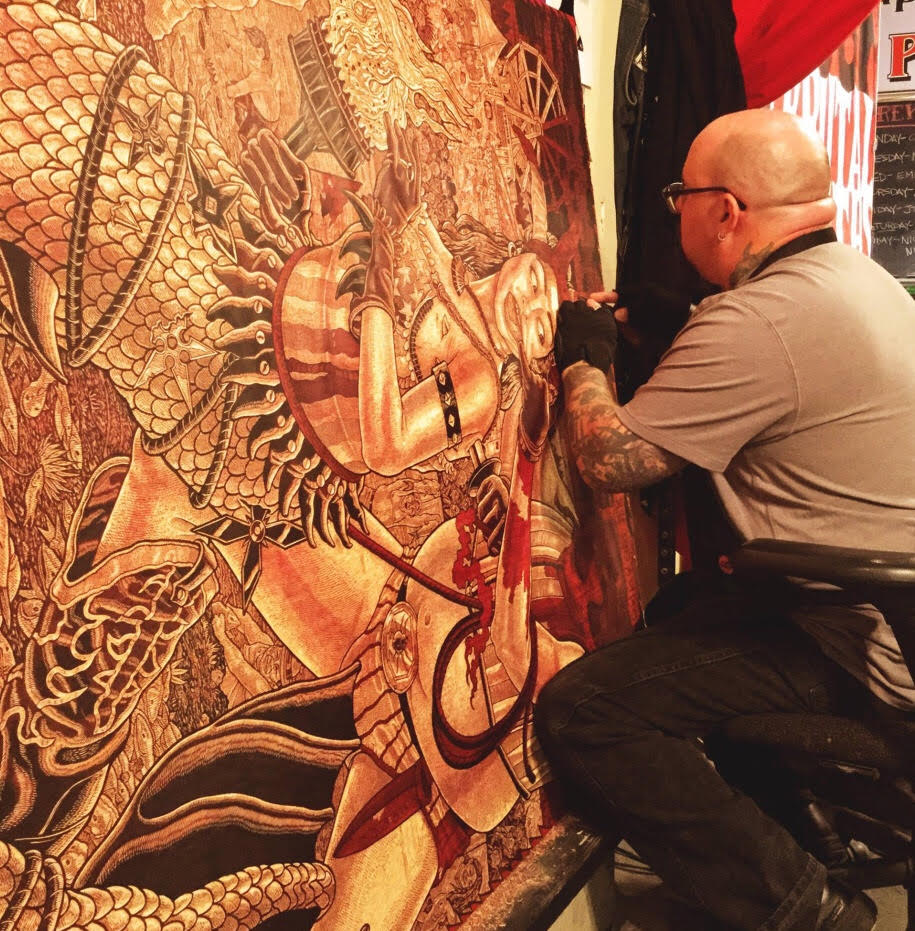
Huck at work on a block in the studio (2016).jpg

Hück is best known for creating large-scale woodcuts acting as both satirical narratives and social criticism. In his own words, "My work deals with personal observations about the experiences of living in a small town in southeast Missouri. The often strange and humorous occurrences, places, and people in these towns offer a never-ending source of inspiration for my prints. I call this work 'rural satire'".

In an inversion of the standard commercial route to success, Hück began his career by going from door to door showing his work to museum curators. His first major sale was to the Fogg Art Museum at Harvard University in 1998, a copy of his first major portfolio: 2 Weeks in August: 14 Rural Absurdities (1995–1998). He followed this with The Bloody Bucket (1999–2005). He then created a suite of monumental works collectively called Booger Stew. The first of these, "The Transformation of Brandy Baghead Pts. 1, 2, & 3", is a triptych and was completed in 2009. Since then, two more pieces in the series have been completed, The Tommy Peeperz (2009–2013) and Electric Baloneyland (2013–2018). While working on these large prints, Hück has produced smaller works, such as the portfolio titled The Hillbilly Kama Sutra (2012), and the chiaroscuro woodcut The Great Warmadillo.

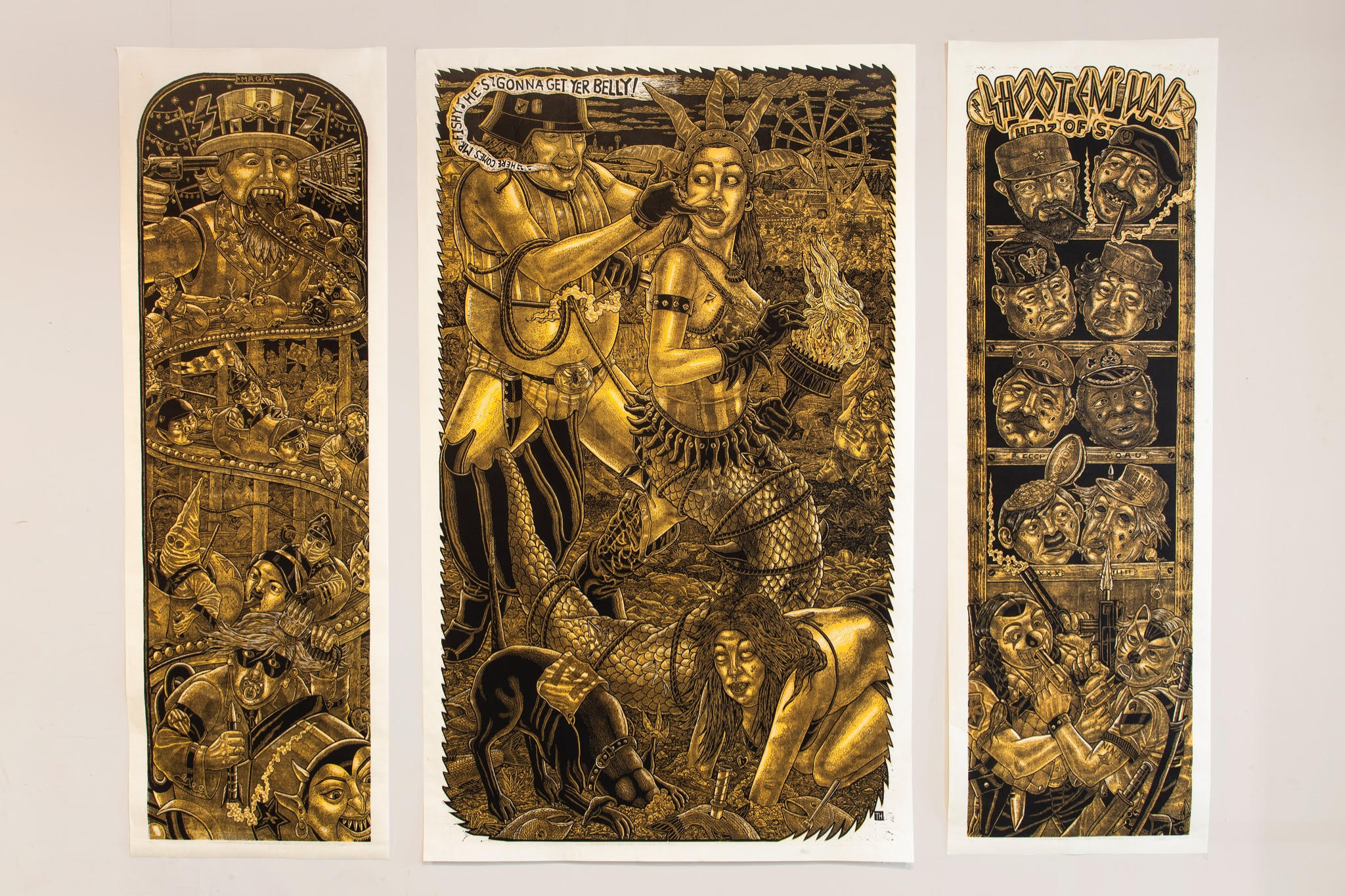
Electric Baloneyland

Hück's latest work, A Monkey Mountain Kronikle: A Devotional Woodcut for the Ages, is a medieval altarpiece on paper, inspired by famous altarpieces by Jan van Eyck and other Flemish painters of the late Middle Ages.

Aside from these major works, Hück has created several works smaller in scale and has also been invited to work in collaboration with other workshops, including Landfall Press and Lawrence Lithography, who have published his editions. As an illustrator, he has designed logos, posters, and apparel for musicians and organizations, such as album covers, posters, t-shirts, and ephemera. In 2002 he designed the cover of The Roots' album Phrenology, and in 2009 he designed the poster for the band Motörhead and their show at The Pageant in St. Louis. Hück's illustrations have appeared in BLAB! from Fantagraphics Books as well as The Village Voice, The Riverfront Times, and the Minneapolis City Pages.

== Biography ==
Tom Huck was born on December 9, 1971, in Farmington, Missouri, and grew up in nearby Potosi. He received a BFA in drawing from Southern Illinois University at Carbondale in 1993 and an MFA in printmaking from the Sam Fox School of Design & Visual Arts at Washington University in St. Louis in 1995. From 2000 to 2010 he was an instructor in printmaking at Washington University. From 1999 to 2020 Hück's studio, Evil Prints, was located in downtown St. Louis. In 2020 he moved Evil Prints to Park Hills, Missouri.

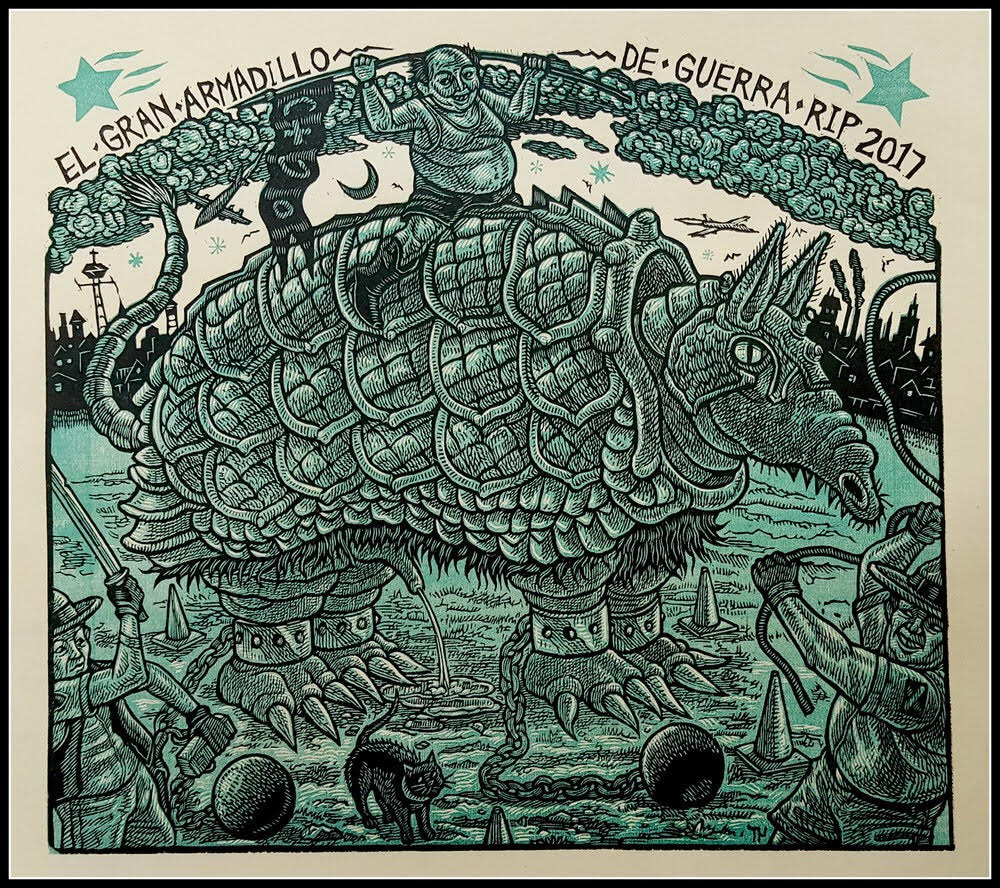
"The Great War-Madillo" woodcut by Tom Huck

== Style and influences ==
Hück draws his influences mainly from Northern Renaissance masters, such as Albrecht Dürer whom he cites as a "print hero". Other influences include José Guadalupe Posada, Honoré Daumier, and Francisco José de Goya y Lucientes.

Huck's work is also known for his delicate and intricate method of carving and use of cross-hatching in the print medium. It has been described as having "a real delicacy of touch" and "an extraordinary landscape of marks".

== Collections ==
Hück's woodcut prints are included in the collections of, the Metropolitan Museum of Art; the National Gallery of Art; Whitney Museum of American Art; the Library of Congress; the Fogg Museum, Harvard University; Museum of Fine Arts, Houston; The Art Institute of Chicago; Lambert International Airport; Saint Louis Art Museum; and Laumeier Sculpture Park, among others.
