= BLAB! =

Comics anthology

Publication information
- Publisher: Monte Comix; Fantagraphics; Kitchen Sink Press; Dark Horse Comics
- Schedule: Annually
- Format: Ongoing series
- Publication date: 1988–2007
- No. of issues: 18
- Editor: Monte Beauchamp

Collected editions
- New & Used Blab!: ISBN 0-8118-4026-3

Blab! was an anthology edited by Monte Beauchamp that featured a mixture of alternative comics and illustrated features focused predominantly on illustration, graphic design, and lowbrow art.

The first two issues (1986–87) were published by Beauchamp's own imprint, Monte Comix. In 1988 Kitchen Sink Press took over the title, publishing issues #3-8 as well as printing new editions of issues #1 and 2. Issues #9–18 were published annually by Fantagraphics between 1997 and 2007 in a 120-page, 10" x 10" square format featuring both black-and-white and color art. In 2010 Last Gasp revived the series for two issues under the title Blab World.

In 2003, Chronicle Books published the book collection New & Used Blab!. As the title suggests, one half of the book consists of selections from previous issues while the other half (bound dos-à-dos style) features new works by frequent contributors. Several solo books by individual Blab! contributors were published with the subtitle "A Blab! Storybook".

Dark Horse Comics announced that the anthology would return in May 2023 under the title Comics and Stories That Will Make You BLAB!
