= Animal consciousness =

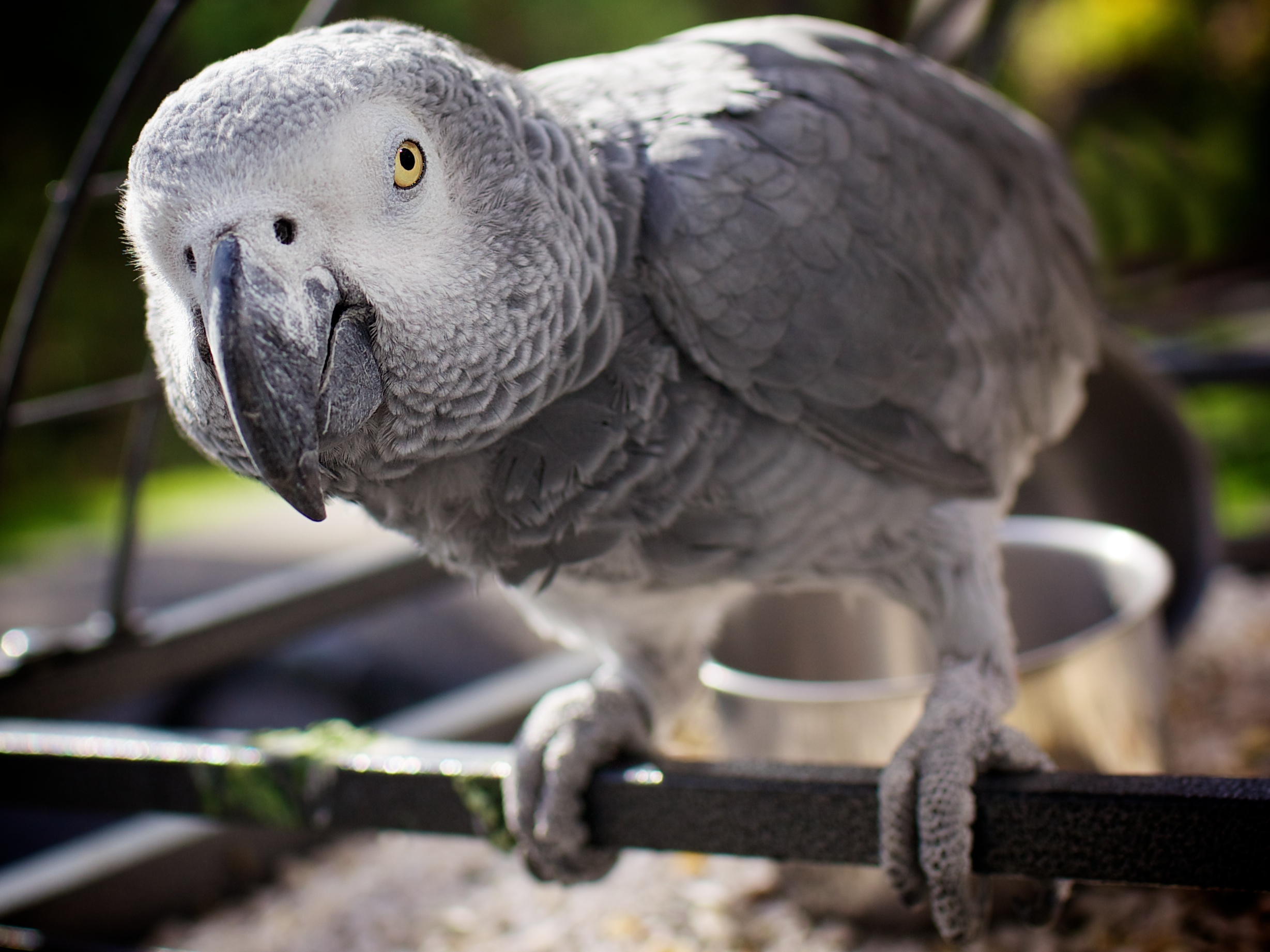
According to the Cambridge Declaration on Consciousness, "near human-like levels of consciousness" have been observed in the grey parrot.

Animal consciousness, or animal awareness, is the quality or state of self-awareness within an animal, or of being aware of an external object or of something within itself. In humans, consciousness has been defined as: sentience, awareness, subjectivity, qualia, the ability to experience or to feel, wakefulness, having a sense of selfhood, and the executive control system of the mind. Despite the difficulty in definition, many philosophers believe there is a broadly shared underlying intuition about what consciousness is.

The topic of animal consciousness is beset with a number of difficulties. It poses the problem of other minds in an especially severe form because animals, lacking the ability to use human language, cannot communicate their experiences. It is also difficult to reason objectively about the question because a denial that an animal is conscious is often taken to imply that they do not feel, their life has no value, and that harming them is not morally wrong. For example, the 17th-century French philosopher René Descartes is sometimes criticised for enabling animal mistreatment through his animal machine view, which claimed that only humans are conscious.

Philosophers who consider subjective experience the essence of consciousness also generally believe, as a correlate, that the existence and nature of animal consciousness can never rigorously be known. The American philosopher Thomas Nagel spelled out this point of view in an influential essay titled What Is it Like to Be a Bat? He said that an organism is conscious "if and only if there is something that it is like to be that organism—something it is like for the organism"; and he argued that no matter how much we know about an animal's brain and behavior, we can never really put ourselves into the mind of the animal and experience their world in the way they do themselves. Other thinkers, such as the cognitive scientist Douglas Hofstadter, dismiss this argument as incoherent. Several psychologists and ethologists have argued for the existence of animal consciousness by describing a range of behaviors that appear to show animals holding beliefs about things they cannot directly perceive—Walter Veit's 2023 book A Philosophy for the Science of Animal Consciousness reviews a substantial portion of the evidence.

Animal consciousness has been actively researched for over one hundred years. In 1927, the American functional psychologist Harvey Carr argued that any valid measure or understanding of awareness in animals depends on "an accurate and complete knowledge of its essential conditions in man". A more recent review concluded in 1985 that "the best approach is to use experiment (especially psychophysics) and observation to trace the dawning and ontogeny of self-consciousness, perception, communication, intention, beliefs, and reflection in normal human fetuses, infants, and children". In 2012, a group of neuroscientists signed the Cambridge Declaration on Consciousness, which "unequivocally" asserted that "humans are not unique in possessing the neurological substrates that generate consciousness. Non-human animals, including all mammals and birds, and many other creatures, including octopuses, also possess these neural substrates." In 2024, more than 500 academics and scientists signed the New York Declaration on Animal Consciousness. The declaration states that there is strong scientific support for consciousness in mammals and birds and that it is a realistic possibility in other vertebrates and many invertebrates. It calls for these considerations to be taken into account in decisions affecting animals.

== Philosophical background ==
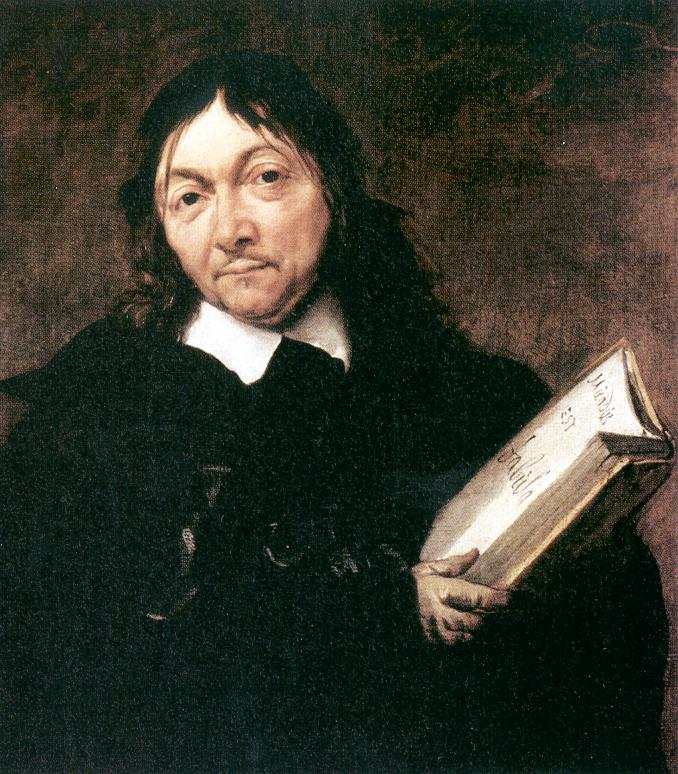
René Descartes argued that consciousness is unique to humans and explained animal behaviour through his mechanistic account of animals.

The mind–body problem in philosophy examines the relationship between mind and matter, and in particular the relationship between consciousness and the brain. A variety of approaches have been proposed. Most are either dualist or monist. Dualism maintains a rigid distinction between the realms of mind and matter. Monism maintains that there is only one kind of stuff, and that mind and matter are both aspects of it. The problem was addressed by pre-Aristotelian philosophers, and was famously addressed by René Descartes in the 17th century, resulting in Cartesian dualism. Descartes believed that humans alone possess a non-physical mind, interpreting animal behaviour through a mechanistic model that denied animal consciousness.

The rejection of the mind–body dichotomy is found in French Structuralism, and is a position that generally characterized post-war French philosophy. The absence of an empirically identifiable meeting point between the non-physical mind and its physical extension has proven problematic to dualism and many modern philosophers of mind maintain that the mind is not something separate from the body. These approaches have been particularly influential in the sciences, particularly in the fields of sociobiology, computer science, evolutionary psychology, and the neurosciences.

=== Epiphenomenalism ===
Epiphenomenalism is the theory in philosophy of mind that mental phenomena are caused by physical processes in the brain or that both are effects of a common cause, as opposed to mental phenomena driving the physical mechanics of the brain. The impression that thoughts, feelings, or sensations cause physical effects, is therefore to be understood as illusory to some extent. For example, it is not the feeling of fear that produces an increase in heart beat, both are symptomatic of a common physiological origin, possibly in response to a legitimate external threat.

The history of epiphenomenalism goes back to the post-Cartesian attempt to solve the riddle of Cartesian dualism, i.e., of how mind and body could interact. La Mettrie, Leibniz and Spinoza all in their own way began this way of thinking. The idea that even if the animal were conscious nothing would be added to the production of behavior, even in animals of the human type, was first voiced by La Mettrie (1745), and then by Cabanis (1802), and was further explicated by Hodgson (1870) and Huxley (1874). Huxley (1874) likened mental phenomena to the whistle on a steam locomotive. However, epiphenomenalism flourished primarily as it found a niche among methodological or scientific behaviorism. In the early 1900s scientific behaviorists such as Ivan Pavlov, John B. Watson, and B. F. Skinner began the attempt to uncover laws describing the relationship between stimuli and responses, without reference to inner mental phenomena. Instead of adopting a form of eliminativism or mental fictionalism, positions that deny that inner mental phenomena exist, a behaviorist was able to adopt epiphenomenalism in order to allow for the existence of mind. However, by the 1960s, scientific behaviourism met substantial difficulties and eventually gave way to the cognitive revolution. Participants in that revolution, such as Jerry Fodor, reject epiphenomenalism and insist upon the efficacy of the mind. Fodor even speaks of "epiphobia"—fear that one is becoming an epiphenomenalist.

Thomas Henry Huxley defends in an essay titled On the Hypothesis that Animals are Automata, and its History an epiphenomenalist theory of consciousness according to which consciousness is a causally inert effect of neural activity—"as the steam-whistle which accompanies the work of a locomotive engine is without influence upon its machinery". To this William James objects in his essay Are We Automata? by stating an evolutionary argument for mind-brain interaction implying that if the preservation and development of consciousness in the biological evolution is a result of natural selection, it is plausible that consciousness has not only been influenced by neural processes, but has had a survival value itself; and it could only have had this if it had been efficacious. Karl Popper develops in the book The Self and Its Brain a similar evolutionary argument.

=== Animal ethics ===
Bernard Rollin of Colorado State University, the principal author of two U.S. federal laws regulating pain relief for animals, writes that researchers remained unsure into the 1980s as to whether animals experience pain, and veterinarians trained in the U.S. before 1989 were simply taught to ignore animal pain. In his interactions with scientists and other veterinarians, Rollin asserts that he was regularly asked to prove animals are conscious and provide scientifically acceptable grounds for claiming they feel pain. The denial of animal consciousness by scientists has been labelled as mentophobia by Donald Griffin. Academic reviews of the topic are equivocal, noting that the argument that animals have at least simple conscious thoughts and feelings has strong support, but some critics continue to question how reliably animal mental states can be determined. A refereed journal Animal Sentience launched in 2016 by the Institute of Science and Policy of The Humane Society of the United States is devoted to research on this and related topics.

== Defining consciousness ==
About forty meanings attributed to the term consciousness can be identified and categorized based on functions and experiences. The prospects for reaching any single, agreed-upon, theory-independent definition of consciousness appear remote.

Consciousness is an elusive concept that presents many difficulties when attempts are made to define it. Its study has progressively become an interdisciplinary challenge for numerous researchers, including ethologists, neurologists, cognitive neuroscientists, philosophers, psychologists and psychiatrists.

In 1976, Richard Dawkins wrote, "The evolution of the capacity to simulate seems to have culminated in subjective consciousness. Why this should have happened is, to me, the most profound mystery facing modern biology." In 2004, eight neuroscientists felt it was still too soon for a definition. They wrote an apology in "Human Brain Function", in which they stated:

We have no idea how consciousness emerges from the physical activity of the brain and we do not know whether consciousness can emerge from non-biological systems, such as computers... At this point the reader will expect to find a careful and precise definition of consciousness. You will be disappointed. Consciousness has not yet become a scientific term that can be defined in this way. Currently we all use the term consciousness in many different and often ambiguous ways. Precise definitions of different aspects of consciousness will emerge ... but to make precise definitions at this stage is premature.

Consciousness is sometimes defined as the quality or state of being aware of an external object or something within oneself. It has been defined somewhat vaguely as: subjectivity, awareness, sentience, the ability to experience or to feel, wakefulness, having a sense of selfhood, and the executive control system of the mind. Despite the difficulty in definition, many philosophers believe that there is a broadly shared underlying intuition about what consciousness is. Max Velmans and Susan Schneider wrote in The Blackwell Companion to Consciousness: "Anything that we are aware of at a given moment forms part of our consciousness, making conscious experience at once the most familiar and most mysterious aspect of our lives."

Related terms, also often used in vague or ambiguous ways, are:

- Awareness: the state or ability to perceive, to feel, or to be conscious of events, objects, or sensory patterns. In this level of consciousness, sense data can be confirmed by an observer without necessarily implying understanding. More broadly, it is the state or quality of being aware of something. In biological psychology, awareness is defined as a human's or an animal's perception and cognitive reaction to a condition or event.
- Self-awareness: the capacity for introspection and the ability to reconcile oneself as an individual separate from the environment and other individuals.
- Self-consciousness: an acute sense of self-awareness. It is a preoccupation with oneself, as opposed to the philosophical state of self-awareness, which is the awareness that one exists as an individual being; although some writers use both terms interchangeably or synonymously.
- Sentience: the ability to be aware (feel, perceive, or be conscious) of one's surroundings or to have subjective experiences. Sentience is a minimalistic way of defining consciousness, which is otherwise commonly used to collectively describe sentience plus other characteristics of the mind.
- Sapience: often defined as wisdom, or the ability of an organism or entity to act with appropriate judgment, a mental faculty which is a component of intelligence or alternatively may be considered an additional faculty, apart from intelligence, with its own properties.
- Qualia: individual instances of subjective, conscious experience.

Sentience (the ability to feel, perceive, or to experience subjectivity) is not the same as self-awareness (being aware of oneself as an individual). The mirror test is sometimes considered to be an operational test for self-awareness, and the handful of animals that have passed it are often considered to be self-aware. It remains debatable whether recognition of one's mirror image can be properly construed to imply full self-awareness, particularly given that robots are being constructed which appear to pass the test.

Much has been learned in neuroscience about correlations between brain activity and subjective, conscious experiences, and many suggest that neuroscience will ultimately explain consciousness; "...consciousness is a biological process that will eventually be explained in terms of molecular signaling pathways used by interacting populations of nerve cells...". However, this view has been criticized because consciousness has yet to be shown to be a process, and the so-called "hard problem" of relating consciousness directly to brain activity remains elusive.

== Scientific approaches ==
Since Descartes's proposal of dualism, it became general consensus that the mind had become a matter of philosophy and that science was not able to penetrate the issue of consciousness – that consciousness was outside of space and time. However, in recent decades many scholars have begun to move toward a science of consciousness. Antonio Damasio and Gerald Edelman are two neuroscientists who have led the move to neural correlates of the self and of consciousness. Damasio has demonstrated that emotions and their biological foundation play a critical role in high level cognition, and Edelman has created a framework for analyzing consciousness through a scientific outlook. The current problem consciousness researchers face involves explaining how and why consciousness arises from neural computation. In his research on this problem, Edelman has developed a theory of consciousness, in which he has coined the terms primary consciousness and secondary consciousness.

Eugene Linden, author of The Parrot's Lament suggests there are many examples of animal behavior and intelligence that surpass what people would suppose to be the boundary of animal consciousness. Linden contends that in many of these documented examples, a variety of animal species exhibit behavior that can only be attributed to emotion, and to a level of consciousness that we would normally ascribe only to our own species.

Philosopher Daniel Dennett counters:

Consciousness requires a certain kind of informational organization that does not seem to be 'hard-wired' in humans, but is instilled by human culture. Moreover, consciousness is not a black-or-white, all-or-nothing type of phenomenon, as is often assumed. The differences between humans and other species are so great that speculations about animal consciousness seem ungrounded. Many authors simply assume that an animal like a bat has a point of view, but there seems to be little interest in exploring the details involved.

Consciousness in mammals (including humans) is an aspect of the mind generally thought to comprise qualities such as subjectivity, sentience, and the ability to perceive the relationship between oneself and one's environment. It is a subject of much research in philosophy of mind, psychology, neuroscience, and cognitive science. Some philosophers divide consciousness into phenomenal consciousness, which is subjective experience itself, and access consciousness, which refers to the global availability of information to processing systems in the brain. Phenomenal consciousness has many different experienced qualities, often referred to as qualia. Phenomenal consciousness is usually consciousness of something or about something, a property known as intentionality in philosophy of mind.

In humans, there are three common methods of studying consciousness: verbal reporting, behavioural demonstrations, and neural correlation with conscious activity, though these can only be generalized to non-human taxa with varying degrees of difficulty. In a new study conducted in rhesus monkeys, Ben-Haim and his team used a process dissociation approach that predicted opposite behavioral outcomes for the two modes of perception. They found that monkeys displayed exactly the same opposite behavioral outcomes as humans when they were aware or unaware of the stimuli presented.

=== Mirror test ===
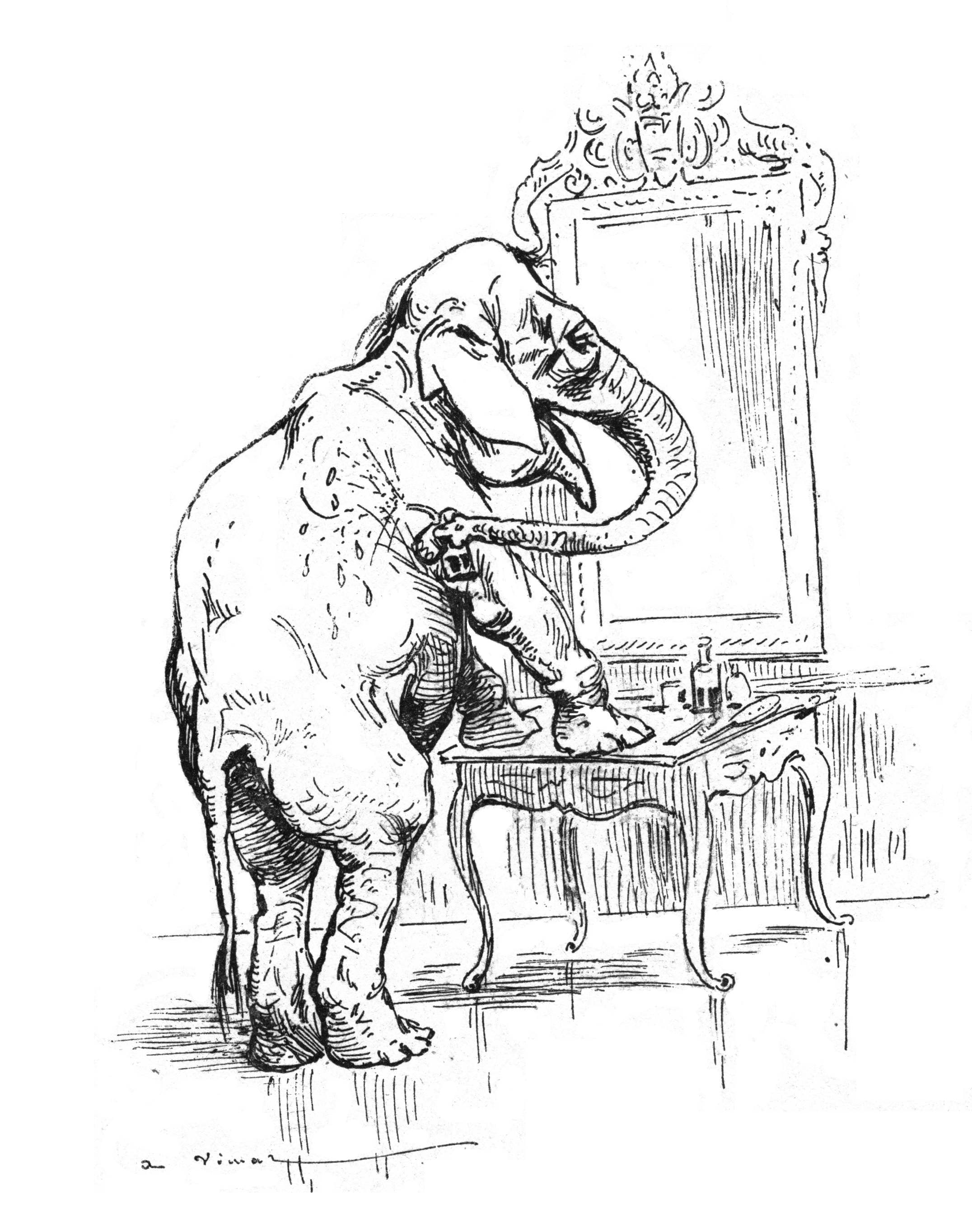
Elephants can recognize themselves in a mirror.

External videos
- Self-recognition in apes – National Geographic

The sense in which animals (or human infants) can be said to have consciousness or a self-concept has been hotly debated; it is often referred to as the debate over animal minds. The best known research technique in this area is the mirror test devised by Gordon G. Gallup, in which the skin of an animal (or human infant) is marked, while they are asleep or sedated, with a mark that cannot be seen directly but is visible in a mirror. The animals are then allowed to see their reflection in a mirror; if the animal spontaneously directs grooming behaviour towards the mark, that is taken as an indication that they are aware of themselves. Over the past 30 years, many studies have found evidence that animals recognise themselves in mirrors. Self-awareness by this criterion has been reported for:

- Land mammals: apes (chimpanzees, orangutans and gorillas) and elephants.
- Cetaceans: bottlenose dolphins, killer whales and possibly false killer whales.
- Birds: magpies and pigeons (can pass the mirror test after training in the prerequisite behaviors).

Until recently, it was thought that self-recognition was absent in animals without a neocortex, and was restricted to mammals with large brains and well-developed social cognition. However, in 2008, a study of self-recognition in corvids reported significant results for magpies. Mammals and birds inherited the same brain components from their last common ancestor nearly 300 million years ago, and have since independently evolved and formed significantly different brain types. The results of the mirror and mark tests showed that neocortex-less magpies are capable of understanding that a mirror image belongs to their own body. The findings show that magpies respond in the mirror and mark tests in a manner similar to apes, dolphins and elephants. The magpies were chosen to study based on their empathy and lifestyle, a possible precursor to their ability to develop self-awareness. For chimpanzees, the occurrence is about 75% in young adults and considerably less in young and old individuals. For monkeys, non-primate mammals, and a number of bird species, exploration of the mirror and social displays were observed. Hints at mirror-induced self-directed behavior have been obtained.

According to a 2019 study, cleaner wrasses have become the first fish ever observed to pass the mirror test. However, the test's inventor Gordon Gallup has said that the fish were most likely trying to scrape off a perceived parasite on another fish and that they did not demonstrate self-recognition. The authors of the study responded that because the fish checked themselves in the mirror before and after the scraping, this meant that the fish had self-awareness and recognized that their reflections belonged to their own bodies.

The mirror test has attracted controversy among some researchers because it is entirely focused on vision, the primary sense in humans, while other species rely more heavily on other senses such as the olfactory sense in dogs.

=== Language ===
External videos
- Whale song – Oceania Project
- This is Einstein! – Knoxville Zoo

Another approach to determine whether a non-human animal is conscious derives from passive speech research with a macaw (see Arielle). Some researchers propose that by passively listening to an animal's voluntary speech, it is possible to learn about the thoughts of another creature and to determine that the speaker is conscious. This type of research was originally used to investigate a child's crib speech by Weir (1962) and in investigations of early speech in children by Greenfield and others (1976).

Zipf's law might be able to be used to indicate if a given dataset of animal communication indicate an intelligent natural language. Some researchers have used this algorithm to study bottlenose dolphin language.

=== Pain or suffering ===
Further arguments revolve around the ability of animals to feel pain or suffering, which implies consciousness. If animals can be shown to suffer in ways comparable to humans, ethical arguments against human suffering may be extended to animals. Some scholars argue that pain can be inferred from non-purposeful or maladaptive reactions to negative stimuli. One such reaction is transmarginal inhibition, a phenomenon observed in both humans and some animals that resembles mental breakdown.

Cosmologist Carl Sagan argues that humans often deny animal suffering to justify practices such as enslavement, experimentation, and consumption. He contends that behavioral similarities between humans and other animals challenge such denials.

John Webster, professor of animal husbandry, argues that suffering is not dependent on intelligence or brain size. He states that sentient animals actively seek pleasure and display behaviors indicating enjoyment, such as basking in the sun.

However, there is no consensus about which organisms are capable of experiencing pain. Philosopher Justin Leiber discusses varying views: Michel de Montaigne attributes consciousness to insects and even plants, while Peter Singer and Samuel Clarke deny it in simpler organisms like sponges. Singer places the boundary somewhere between shrimp and oysters, while others speculate about insects, spiders, or tapeworms.

Some critics draw comparisons to plants, questioning whether a focus on animal suffering is entirely distinct. Science writer Carol Kaesuk Yoon describes how plants, when damaged, initiate chemical defenses and repair processes, though these do not necessarily imply consciousness.

=== Cognitive bias and emotion ===
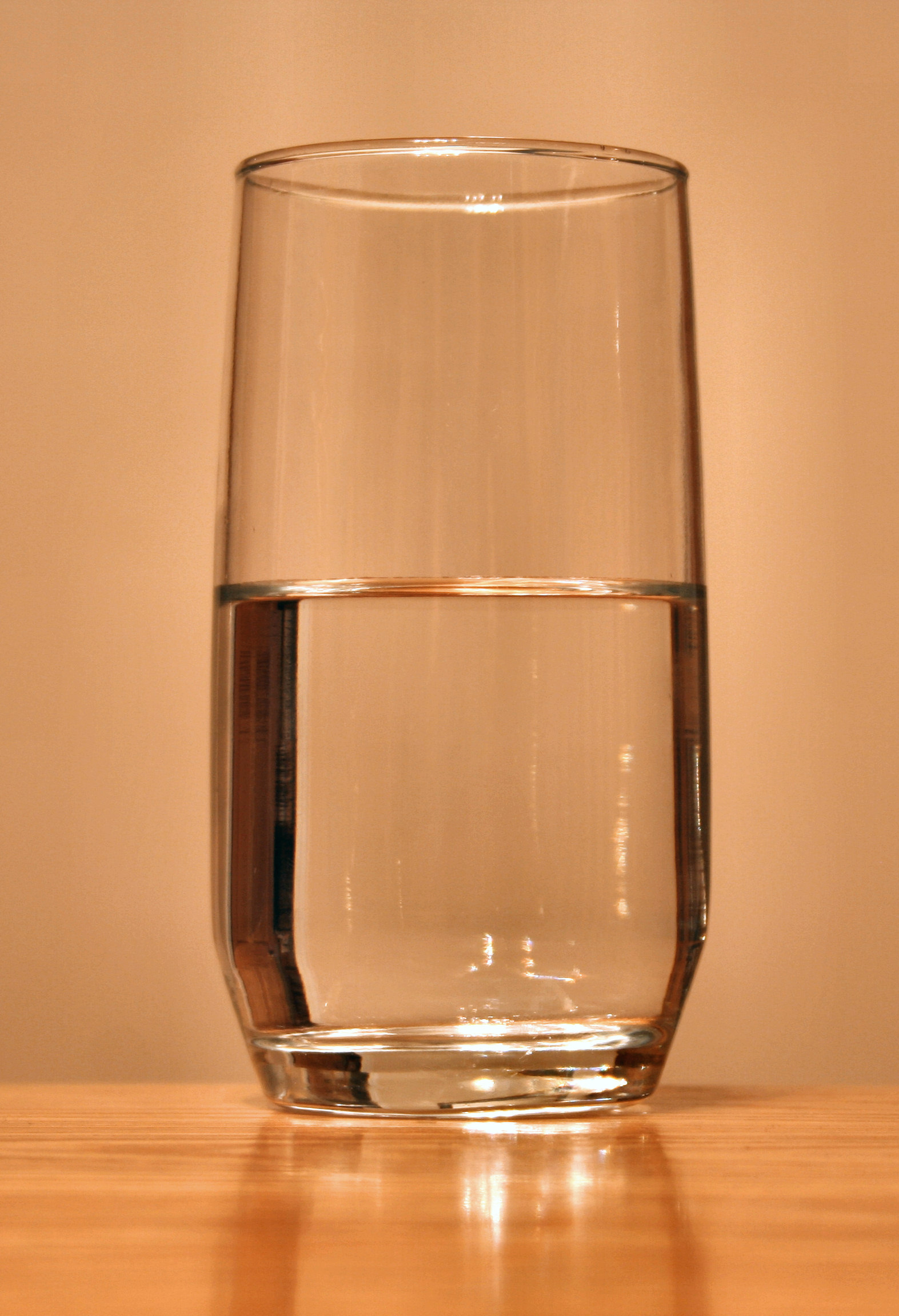
Is the glass half empty or half full?

Cognitive bias in animals is a pattern of deviation in judgment, whereby inferences about other animals and situations may be drawn in an illogical fashion. Individuals create their own "subjective social reality" from their perception of the input. It refers to the question "Is the glass half empty or half full?", used as an indicator of optimism or pessimism. Cognitive biases have been shown in a wide range of species including rats, dogs, rhesus macaques, sheep, chicks, starlings and honeybees.

The neuroscientist Joseph LeDoux advocates avoiding terms derived from human subjective experience when discussing brain functions in animals. For example, the common practice of calling brain circuits that detect and respond to threats "fear circuits" implies that these circuits are responsible for feelings of fear. LeDoux argues that Pavlovian fear conditioning should be renamed Pavlovian threat conditioning to avoid the implication that "fear" is being acquired in rats or humans. Key to his theoretical change is the notion of survival functions mediated by survival circuits, the purpose of which is to keep organisms alive rather than to make emotions. For example, defensive survival circuits exist to detect and respond to threats. While all organisms can do this, only organisms that can be conscious of their own brain's activities can feel fear. Fear is a conscious experience and occurs the same way as any other kind of conscious experience: via cortical circuits that allow attention to certain forms of brain activity. LeDoux argues the only differences between an emotional and non-emotion state of consciousness are the underlying neural ingredients that contribute to the state.

=== Neuroscience ===
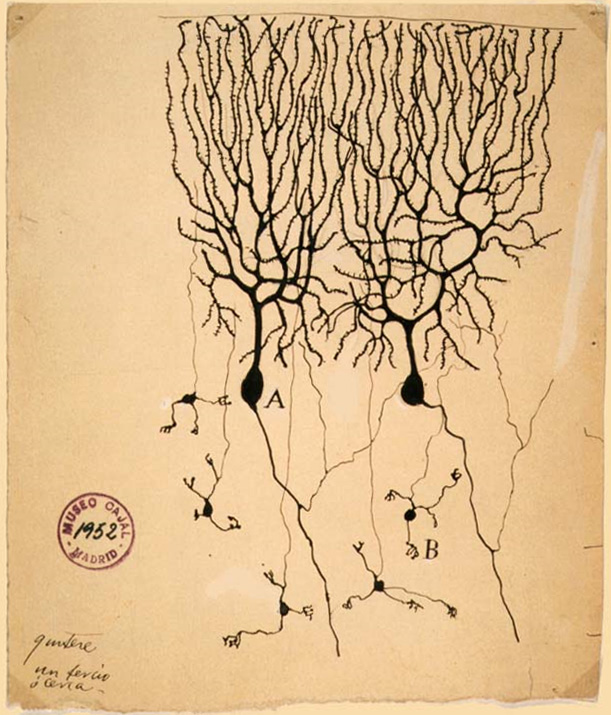
Drawing by Santiago Ramón y Cajal (1899) of neurons in the pigeon cerebellum

Neuroscience is the scientific study of the nervous system. It is a highly active interdisciplinary science that collaborates with many other fields. The scope of neuroscience has broadened recently to include molecular, cellular, developmental, structural, functional, evolutionary, computational, and medical aspects of the nervous system. Theoretical studies of neural networks are being complemented with techniques for imaging sensory and motor tasks in the brain. According to a 2008 paper, neuroscience explanations of psychological phenomena currently have a "seductive allure", and "seem to generate more public interest" than explanations which do not contain neuroscientific information. They found that subjects who were not neuroscience experts "judged that explanations with logically irrelevant neuroscience information were more satisfying than explanations without.

==== Neural correlates ====
The neural correlates of consciousness constitute the minimal set of neuronal events and mechanisms sufficient for a specific conscious percept. Neuroscientists use empirical approaches to discover neural correlates of subjective phenomena. The set should be minimal because, if the brain is sufficient to give rise to any given conscious experience, the question is which of its components is necessary to produce it.

Visual sense and representation was reviewed in 1998 by Francis Crick and Christof Koch. They concluded sensory neuroscience can be used as a bottom-up approach to studying consciousness, and suggested experiments to test various hypotheses in this research stream.

A feature that distinguishes humans from most animals is that we are not born with an extensive repertoire of behavioral programs that would enable us to survive on our own ("physiological prematurity"). To compensate for this, we have an unmatched ability to learn, i.e., to consciously acquire such programs by imitation or exploration. Once consciously acquired and sufficiently exercised, these programs can become automated to the extent that their execution happens beyond the realms of our awareness. Take, as an example, the incredible fine motor skills exerted in playing a Beethoven piano sonata or the sensorimotor coordination required to ride a motorcycle along a curvy mountain road. Such complex behaviors are possible only because a sufficient number of the subprograms involved can be executed with minimal or even suspended conscious control. In fact, the conscious system may actually interfere somewhat with these automated programs.

The growing ability of neuroscientists to manipulate neurons using methods from molecular biology in combination with optical tools depends on the simultaneous development of appropriate behavioural assays and model organisms amenable to large-scale genomic analysis and manipulation.

==== Neocortex and equivalents ====
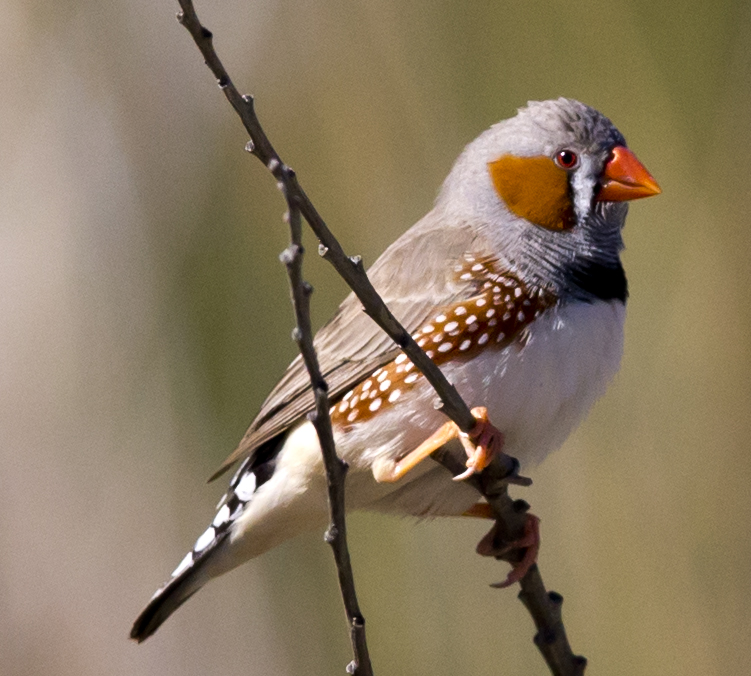
Previously researchers had thought that patterns of neural sleep exhibited by zebra finches needed a mammalian neocortex.

The neocortex is a part of the brain of mammals. It consists of the grey matter, or neuronal cell bodies and unmyelinated fibers, surrounding the deeper white matter (myelinated axons) in the cerebrum. The neocortex is smooth in rodents and other small mammals, whereas in primates and other larger mammals it has deep grooves and wrinkles. These folds increase the surface area of the neocortex considerably without taking up too much more volume. Also, neurons within the same wrinkle have more opportunity for connectivity, while neurons in different wrinkles have less opportunity for connectivity, leading to compartmentalization of the cortex. The neocortex is divided into frontal, parietal, occipital, and temporal lobes, which perform different functions. For example, the occipital lobe contains the primary visual cortex, and the temporal lobe contains the primary auditory cortex. Further subdivisions or areas of neocortex are responsible for more specific cognitive processes. The neocortex is the newest part of the cerebral cortex to evolve (hence the prefix "neo"); the other parts of the cerebral cortex are the paleocortex and archicortex, collectively known as the allocortex. In humans, 90% of the cerebral cortex is neocortex.

Researchers have argued that consciousness in mammals arises in the neocortex, and therefore by extension used to argue that consciousness cannot arise in animals which lack a neocortex. For example, Rose argued in 2002 that the "fishes have nervous systems that mediate effective escape and avoidance responses to noxious stimuli, but, these responses must occur without a concurrent, human-like awareness of pain, suffering or distress, which depend on separately evolved neocortex." Recently that view has been challenged, and many researchers now believe that animal consciousness can arise from homologous subcortical brain networks. For instance, evidence suggests the pallium in bird brains to be functionally equivalent to the mammalian cerebral cortex as a basis of consciousness.

==== Attention ====
Attention is the cognitive process of selectively concentrating on one aspect of the environment while ignoring other things. Attention has also been referred to as the allocation of processing resources. Attention also has variations amongst cultures. Voluntary attention develops in specific cultural and institutional contexts through engagement in cultural activities with more competent community members.

Most experiments show that one neural correlate of attention is enhanced firing. If a neuron has a certain response to a stimulus when the animal is not attending to the stimulus, then when the animal does attend to the stimulus, the neuron's response will be enhanced even if the physical characteristics of the stimulus remain the same. In many cases attention produces changes in the EEG. Many animals, including humans, produce gamma waves (40–60 Hz) when focusing attention on a particular object or activity.

==== Extended consciousness ====
Extended consciousness is an animal's autobiographical self-perception. It is thought to arise in the brains of animals which have a substantial capacity for memory and reason. It does not necessarily require language. The perception of a historic and future self arises from a stream of information from the immediate environment and from neural structures related to memory. The concept was popularised by Antonio Damasio and is used in biological psychology. Extended consciousness is said to arise in structures in the human brain described as image spaces and dispositional spaces. Image spaces imply areas where sensory impressions of all types are processed, including the focused awareness of the core consciousness. Dispositional spaces include convergence zones, which are networks in the brain where memories are processed and recalled, and where knowledge is merged with immediate experience.

==== Metacognition ====
Metacognition is defined as "cognition about cognition", or "knowing about knowing." It can take many forms; it includes knowledge about when and how to use particular strategies for learning or for problem solving. It has been suggested that metacognition in some animals provides evidence for cognitive self-awareness. There are generally two components of metacognition: knowledge about cognition, and regulation of cognition. Writings on metacognition can be traced back at least as far as De Anima and the Parva Naturalia of the Greek philosopher Aristotle. Metacognologists believe that the ability to consciously think about thinking is unique to sapient species and indeed is one of the definitions of sapience. There is evidence that rhesus monkeys and apes can make accurate judgments about the strengths of their memories of fact and monitor their own uncertainty, while attempts to demonstrate metacognition in birds have been inconclusive. A 2007 study provided some evidence for metacognition in rats, but further analysis suggested that they may have been following simple operant conditioning principles, or a behavioral economic model.

==== Mirror neurons ====
Mirror neurons are neurons that fire both when an animal acts and when the animal observes the same action performed by another. Thus, the neuron "mirrors" the behavior of the other, as though the observer were themselves acting. Such neurons have been directly observed in primate and other species including birds. The function of the mirror system is a subject of much speculation. Many researchers in cognitive neuroscience and cognitive psychology consider that this system provides the physiological mechanism for the perception action coupling (see the common coding theory). They argue that mirror neurons may be important for understanding the actions of other people, and for learning new skills by imitation. Some researchers also speculate that mirror systems may simulate observed actions, and thus contribute to theory of mind skills, while others relate mirror neurons to language abilities. Neuroscientists such as Marco Iacoboni (UCLA) have argued that mirror neuron systems in the human brain help us understand the actions and intentions of other people. In a study published in March 2005, Iacoboni and his colleagues reported that mirror neurons could discern if another person who was picking up a cup of tea planned to drink from it or clear it from the table. In addition, Iacoboni and a number of other researchers have argued that mirror neurons are the neural basis of the human capacity for emotions such as empathy. Vilayanur S. Ramachandran has speculated that mirror neurons may provide the neurological basis of self-awareness.

=== Evolutionary psychology ===
Consciousness is likely an evolved adaptation since it meets George Williams' criteria of species universality, complexity, and functionality, and it is a trait that apparently increases fitness. Opinions are divided as to where in biological evolution consciousness emerged and about whether or not consciousness has survival value. It has been argued that consciousness emerged (i) exclusively with the first humans, (ii) exclusively with the first mammals, (iii) independently in mammals and birds, or (iv) with the first reptiles. Donald Griffin suggests in his book Animal Minds a gradual evolution of consciousness. Each of these scenarios raises the question of the possible survival value of consciousness.

In his paper "Evolution of consciousness," John Eccles argues that special anatomical and physical adaptations of the mammalian cerebral cortex gave rise to consciousness. In contrast, others have argued that the recursive circuitry underwriting consciousness is much more primitive, having evolved initially in pre-mammalian species because it improves the capacity for interaction with both social and natural environments by providing an energy-saving "neutral" gear in an otherwise energy-expensive motor output machine. Once in place, this recursive circuitry may well have provided a basis for the subsequent development of many of the functions that consciousness facilitates in higher organisms, as outlined by Bernard J. Baars. Richard Dawkins suggested that humans evolved consciousness in order to make themselves the subjects of thought. Daniel Povinelli suggests that large, tree-climbing apes evolved consciousness to take into account one's own mass when moving safely among tree branches. Consistent with this hypothesis, Gordon Gallup found that chimpanzees and orangutans, but not little monkeys or terrestrial gorillas, demonstrated self-awareness in mirror tests.

The concept of consciousness can refer to voluntary action, awareness, or wakefulness. However, even voluntary behaviour involves unconscious mechanisms. Many cognitive processes take place in the cognitive unconscious, unavailable to conscious awareness. Some behaviours are conscious when learned but then become unconscious, seemingly automatic. Learning, especially implicitly learning a skill, can take place outside of consciousness. For example, plenty of people know how to turn right when they ride a bike, but very few can accurately explain how they actually do so.

=== Neural Darwinism ===
Neural Darwinism is a large scale theory of brain function initially proposed in 1978 by the American biologist Gerald Edelman. Edelman distinguishes between what he calls primary and secondary consciousness:

- Primary consciousness: is the ability, found in humans and some animals, to integrate observed events with memory to create an awareness of the present and immediate past of the world around them. This form of consciousness is also sometimes called "sensory consciousness". Put another way, primary consciousness is the presence of various subjective sensory contents of consciousness such as sensations, perceptions, and mental images. For example, primary consciousness includes a person's experience of the blueness of the ocean, a bird's song, and the feeling of pain. Thus, primary consciousness refers to being mentally aware of things in the world in the present without any sense of past and future; it is composed of mental images bound to a time around the measurable present.
- Secondary consciousness: is an individual's accessibility to their history and plans. The concept is also loosely and commonly associated with having awareness of one's own consciousness. The ability allows its possessors to go beyond the limits of the remembered present of primary consciousness.

Primary consciousness can be defined as simple awareness that includes perception and emotion. As such, it is ascribed to most animals. By contrast, secondary consciousness depends on and includes such features as self-reflective awareness, abstract thinking, volition and metacognition.

Edelman's theory focuses on two nervous system organizations: the brainstem and limbic systems on one side and the thalamus and cerebral cortex on the other side. The brain stem and limbic system take care of essential body functioning and survival, while the thalamocortical system receives signals from sensory receptors and sends out signals to voluntary muscles such as those of the arms and legs. The theory asserts that the connection of these two systems during evolution helped animals learn adaptive behaviors.

Other scientists have argued against Edelman's theory, instead suggesting that primary consciousness might have emerged with the basic vegetative systems of the brain. That is, the evolutionary origin might have come from sensations and primal emotions arising from sensors and receptors, both internal and surface, signaling that the well-being of the creature was immediately threatened—for example, hunger for air, thirst, hunger, pain, and extreme temperature change. This is based on neurological data showing the thalamic, hippocampal, orbitofrontal, insula, and midbrain sites are the key to consciousness of thirst. These scientists also point out that the cortex might not be as important to primary consciousness as some neuroscientists have believed. Some researchers argue that systematic disruption of cortical regions in nonhuman animals does not prevent consciousness, and that reports of consciousness in children born without a cortex are consistent with this view. On this account, brainstem mechanisms are proposed to play a primary role in consciousness. Still, these scientists concede that higher order consciousness does involve the cortex and complex communication between different areas of the brain.

While animals with primary consciousness have long-term memory, they lack explicit narrative, and, at best, can only deal with the immediate scene in the remembered present. While they still have an advantage over animals lacking such ability, evolution has brought forth a growing complexity in consciousness, particularly in mammals. Animals with this complexity are said to have secondary consciousness. Secondary consciousness is seen in animals with semantic capabilities, such as the four great apes. It is present in its richest form in the human species, which is unique in possessing complex language made up of syntax and semantics. In considering how the neural mechanisms underlying primary consciousness arose and were maintained during evolution, it is proposed that at some time around the divergence of reptiles into mammals and then into birds, the embryological development of large numbers of new reciprocal connections allowed rich re-entrant activity to take place between the more posterior brain systems carrying out perceptual categorization and the more frontally located systems responsible for value-category memory. The ability of an animal to relate a present complex scene to their own previous history of learning conferred an adaptive evolutionary advantage. At much later evolutionary epochs, further re-entrant circuits appeared that linked semantic and linguistic performance to categorical and conceptual memory systems. This development enabled the emergence of secondary consciousness.

Ursula Voss of the Universität Bonn believes that the theory of protoconsciousness may serve as adequate explanation for self-recognition found in birds, as they would develop secondary consciousness during REM sleep. She added that many types of birds have very sophisticated language systems. Don Kuiken of the University of Alberta finds such research interesting as well as if we continue to study consciousness with animal models (with differing types of consciousness), we would be able to separate the different forms of reflectiveness found in today's world.

For the advocates of the idea of a secondary consciousness, self-recognition serves as a critical component and a key defining measure. What is most interesting then, is the evolutionary appeal that arises with the concept of self-recognition. In non-human species and in children, the mirror test (see above) has been used as an indicator of self-awareness.

=== Multidimensional framework ===
A 2020 paper by Jonathan Birch, Alexandra K. Schnell, and Nicola S. Clayton outlined a multidimensional approach to animal consciousness, intended to account for variation in conscious experience across species. The authors propose that consciousness may not be meaningfully represented along a single continuum, and instead suggest five distinct dimensions for constructing species-specific profiles.

The proposed dimensions are:

- Perceptual richness (p-richness): the level of sensory detail present in conscious perception, which may vary across different sensory modalities such as vision, olfaction, or touch.
- Evaluative richness (e-richness): the complexity of affective states, including positive and negative valence, and their role in guiding behaviour.
- Unity: the degree to which conscious experience is integrated into a single perspective at a given moment.
- Temporality: the integration of experience over time, including continuity, memory, and anticipation of future events.
- Selfhood: the extent to which an animal exhibits self-related processing, from distinguishing between self and environment to more complex capacities such as mirror self-recognition.

The authors suggest that this framework could facilitate comparative studies of consciousness in different taxa, including mammals, birds, and cephalopods.

== Declarations ==
=== Cambridge Declaration ===
Cambridge Declaration on Consciousness

The absence of a neocortex does not appear to preclude an organism from experiencing affective states. Convergent evidence indicates that non-human animals have the neuroanatomical, neurochemical, and neurophysiological substrates of conscious states along with the capacity to exhibit intentional behaviors. Consequently, the weight of evidence indicates that humans are not unique in possessing the neurological substrates that generate consciousness. Non-human animals, including all mammals and birds, and many other creatures, including octopuses, also possess these neurological substrates.

In 2012, a group of neuroscientists attending a conference on "Consciousness in Human and non-Human Animals" at the University of Cambridge in the UK, signed the Cambridge Declaration on Consciousness (see box on the right).

This declaration "unequivocally" asserts:

- "The field of Consciousness research is rapidly evolving. Abundant new techniques and strategies for human and non-human animal research have been developed. Consequently, more data is becoming readily available, and this calls for a periodic reevaluation of previously held preconceptions in this field. Studies of non-human animals have shown that homologous brain circuits correlated with conscious experience and perception can be selectively facilitated and disrupted to assess whether they are in fact necessary for those experiences. Moreover, in humans, new non-invasive techniques are readily available to survey the correlates of consciousness."

- "The neural substrates of emotions do not appear to be confined to cortical structures. In fact, subcortical neural networks aroused during affective states in humans are also critically important for generating emotional behaviors in animals. Artificial arousal of the same brain regions generates corresponding behavior and feeling states in both humans and non-human animals. Wherever in the brain one evokes instinctual emotional behaviors in non-human animals, many of the ensuing behaviors are consistent with experienced feeling states, including those internal states that are rewarding and punishing. Deep brain stimulation of these systems in humans can also generate similar affective states. Systems associated with affect are concentrated in subcortical regions where neural homologies abound. Young human and non-human animals without neocortices retain these brain-mind functions. Furthermore, neural circuits supporting behavioral/electrophysiological states of attentiveness, sleep and decision making appear to have arisen in evolution as early as the invertebrate radiation, being evident in insects and cephalopod mollusks (e.g., octopus)."

- "Birds appear to offer, in their behavior, neurophysiology, and neuroanatomy a striking case of parallel evolution of consciousness. Evidence of near human-like levels of consciousness has been most dramatically observed in grey parrots. Mammalian and avian emotional networks and cognitive microcircuitries appear to be far more homologous than previously thought. Moreover, certain species of birds have been found to exhibit neural sleep patterns similar to those of mammals, including REM sleep and, as was demonstrated in zebra finches, neurophysiological patterns previously thought to require a mammalian neocortex. Magpies in particular have been shown to exhibit striking similarities to humans, great apes, dolphins, and elephants in studies of mirror self-recognition."

- "In humans, the effect of certain hallucinogens appears to be associated with a disruption in cortical feedforward and feedback processing. Pharmacological interventions in non-human animals with compounds known to affect conscious behavior in humans can lead to similar perturbations in behavior in non-human animals. In humans, there is evidence to suggest that awareness is correlated with cortical activity, which does not exclude possible contributions by subcortical or early cortical processing, as in visual awareness. Evidence that human and non-human animal emotional feelings arise from homologous subcortical brain networks provide compelling evidence for evolutionarily shared primal affective qualia."

=== New York Declaration ===
In 2024, a conference on "The Emerging Science of Animal Consciousness" at New York University produced The New York Declaration on Animal Consciousness. This brief declaration, signed by over 500 scientists and academics, asserts that, in addition to the strong scientific support for consciousness in mammals and birds agreed on by Cambridge, there is also empirical evidence which "indicates at least a realistic possibility of conscious experience in all vertebrates (including reptiles, amphibians, and fishes) and many invertebrates (including, at minimum, cephalopod mollusks, decapod crustaceans, and insects)." The declaration further asserts that "when there is a realistic possibility of conscious experience in an animal, it is irresponsible to ignore that possibility in decisions affecting that animal".

== Examples ==
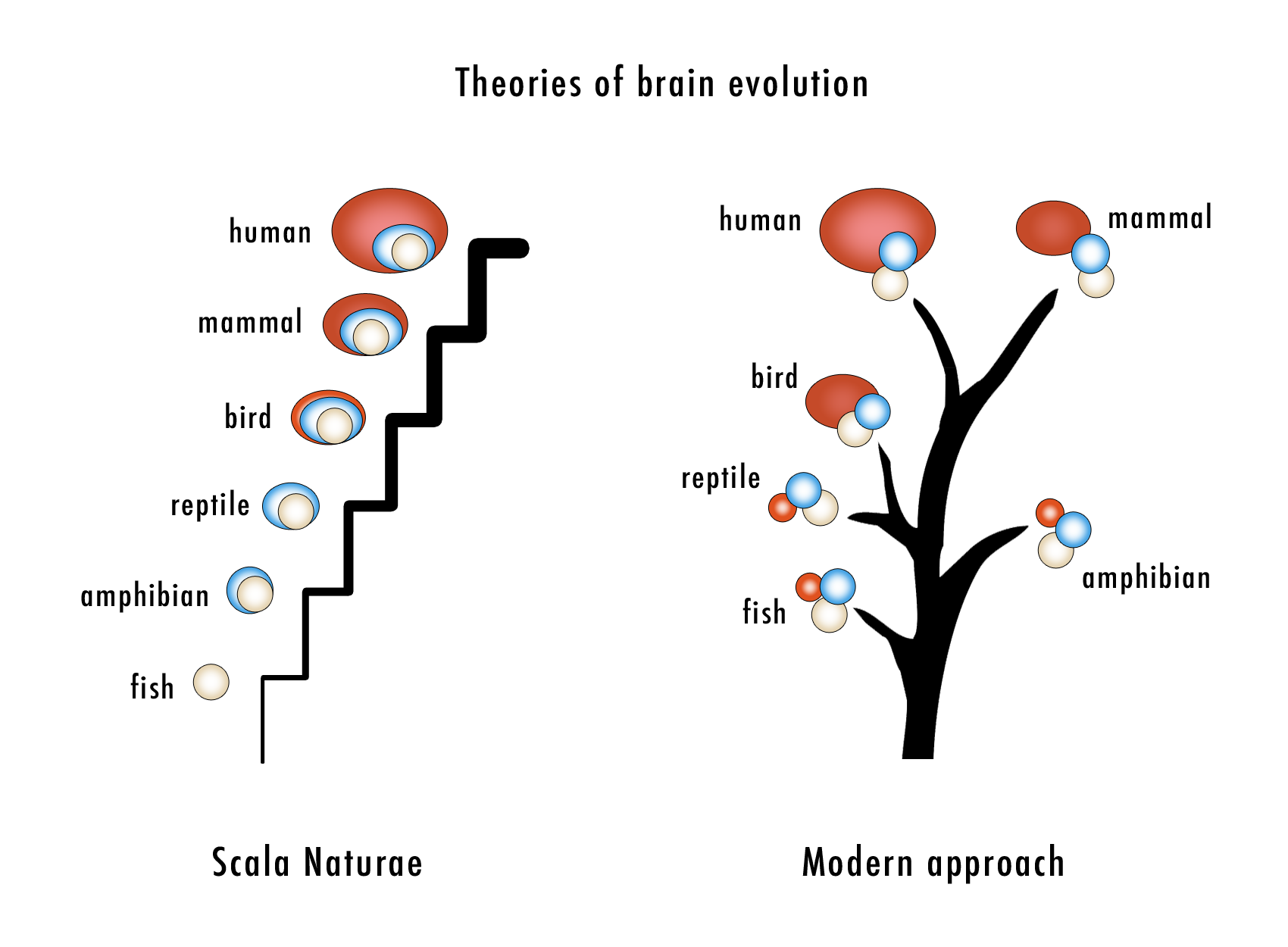
Theories of brain evolution in animals. The old scala naturae model versus the modern approach.

A common image is the scala naturae, the ladder of nature on which animals of different species occupy successively higher rungs, with humans typically at the top. A more useful approach has been to recognize that different animals may have different kinds of cognitive processes, which are better understood in terms of the ways in which they are cognitively adapted to their different ecological niches, than by positing any kind of hierarchy.

=== Mammals ===
==== Dogs ====
Dogs were previously listed as non-self-aware animals. Traditionally, self-consciousness was evaluated via the mirror test. But dogs, and many other animals, are not (as) visually oriented. A 2015 study by biologist Roberto Cazzolla Gatti argues that the "sniff test of self-recognition" (STSR) provides evidence of self-awareness in dogs and that apparent species differences may reflect the methods used to assess it, rather than a capacity confined to great apes, humans, and a few other animals. The study further suggests adopting a species-specific, rather than anthropocentric, approach to research on animal consciousness. This study has been confirmed by another study.

=== Birds ===
==== Grey parrots ====
Research with captive grey parrots, especially Irene Pepperberg's work with an individual named Alex, has demonstrated they possess the ability to associate simple human words with meanings, and to intelligently apply the abstract concepts of shape, colour, number, zero-sense, etc. According to Pepperberg and other scientists, they perform many cognitive tasks at the level of dolphins, chimpanzees, and even human toddlers. Another notable African grey is N'kisi, which in 2004 was said to have a vocabulary of over 950 words which she used in creative ways. For example, when Jane Goodall visited N'kisi in his New York home, he greeted her with "Got a chimp?" because he had seen pictures of her with chimpanzees in Africa.

In 2011, research led by Dalila Bovet of Paris West University Nanterre La Défense, demonstrated grey parrots were able to coordinate and collaborate with each other to an extent. They were able to solve problems such as two birds having to pull strings at the same time to obtain food. In another example, one bird stood on a perch to release a food-laden tray, while the other pulled the tray out from the test apparatus. Both would then feed. The birds were observed waiting for their partners to perform the necessary actions so their behaviour could be synchronized. The parrots appeared to express individual preferences as to which of the other test birds they would work with.

==== Corvids ====
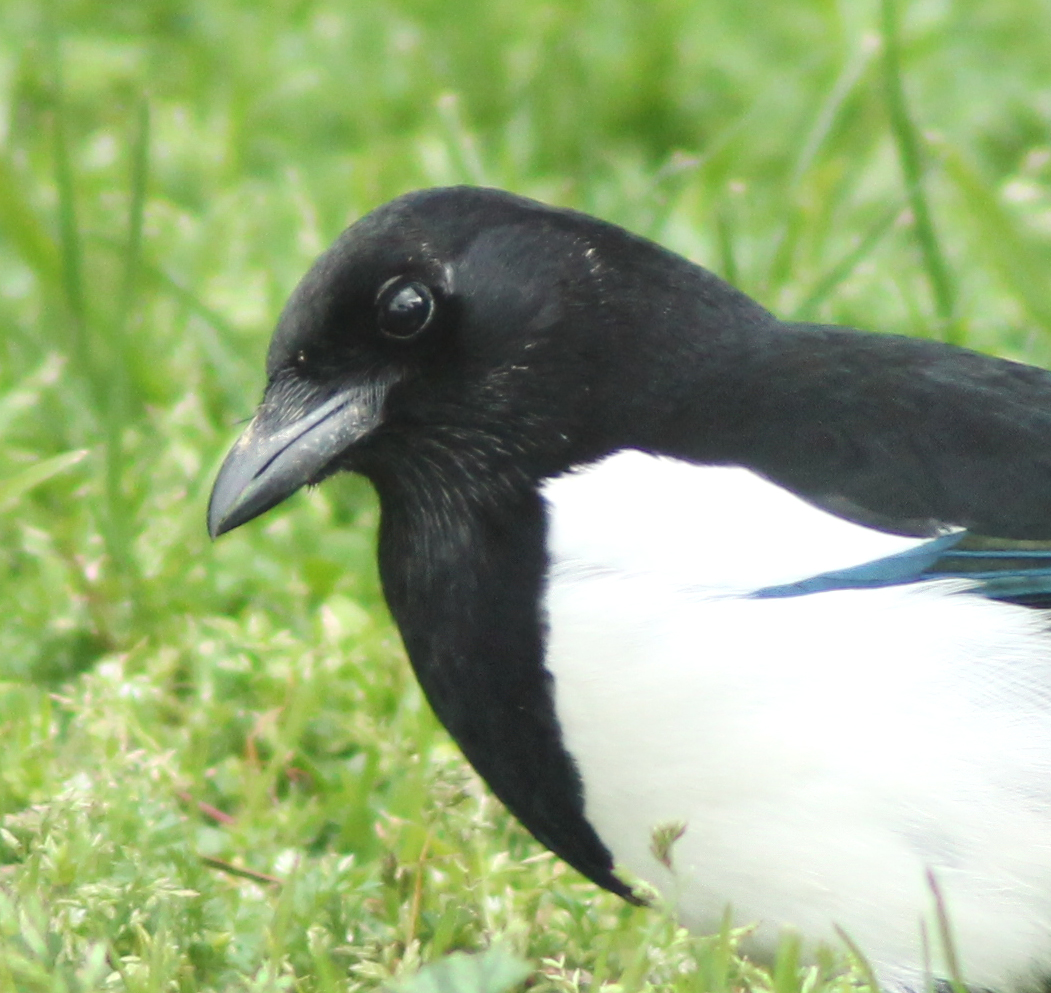
The Eurasian magpie passes the mirror test.

It was thought that self-recognition was restricted to mammals with large brains and highly evolved social cognition, but absent from animals without a neocortex. However, in 2008, an investigation of self-recognition in corvids was conducted to determine the ability of self-recognition in the magpie. Mammals and birds inherited the same brain components from their last common ancestor nearly 300 million years ago, and have since independently evolved and formed significantly different brain types. The results of the mirror test showed that although magpies do not have a neocortex, they are capable of understanding that a mirror image belongs to their own body. The findings show that magpies respond to the mirror test in a manner similar to that of apes, dolphins, killer whales, pigs and elephants.

A 2020 study found that carrion crows show a neuronal response that correlates with their perception of a stimulus, which they argue to be an empirical marker of (avian) sensory consciousness – the conscious perception of sensory input – in the crows which do not have a cerebral cortex. The study thereby substantiates the theory that conscious perception does not require a cerebral cortex and that the basic foundations for it – and possibly for human-type consciousness – may have evolved before the last common ancestor >320 Mya or independently in birds. A related study showed that the birds' pallium's neuroarchitecture is reminiscent of the mammalian cortex.

A 2025 review applied a five-dimensional framework of consciousness to corvids, examining sensory, evaluative, temporal, and self-related aspects of their experience. Drawing on behavioural and neurological evidence, the authors argue that corvids exhibit sophisticated cognitive capacities across all dimensions, including high perceptual acuity, emotional evaluation, episodic-like memory, future planning, and possible forms of self-awareness and theory of mind. While not claiming definitive proof of consciousness, the review supports the growing consensus that corvids are plausible sentient beings and proposes they serve as a model group for the comparative study of non-mammalian consciousness.

=== Invertebrates ===
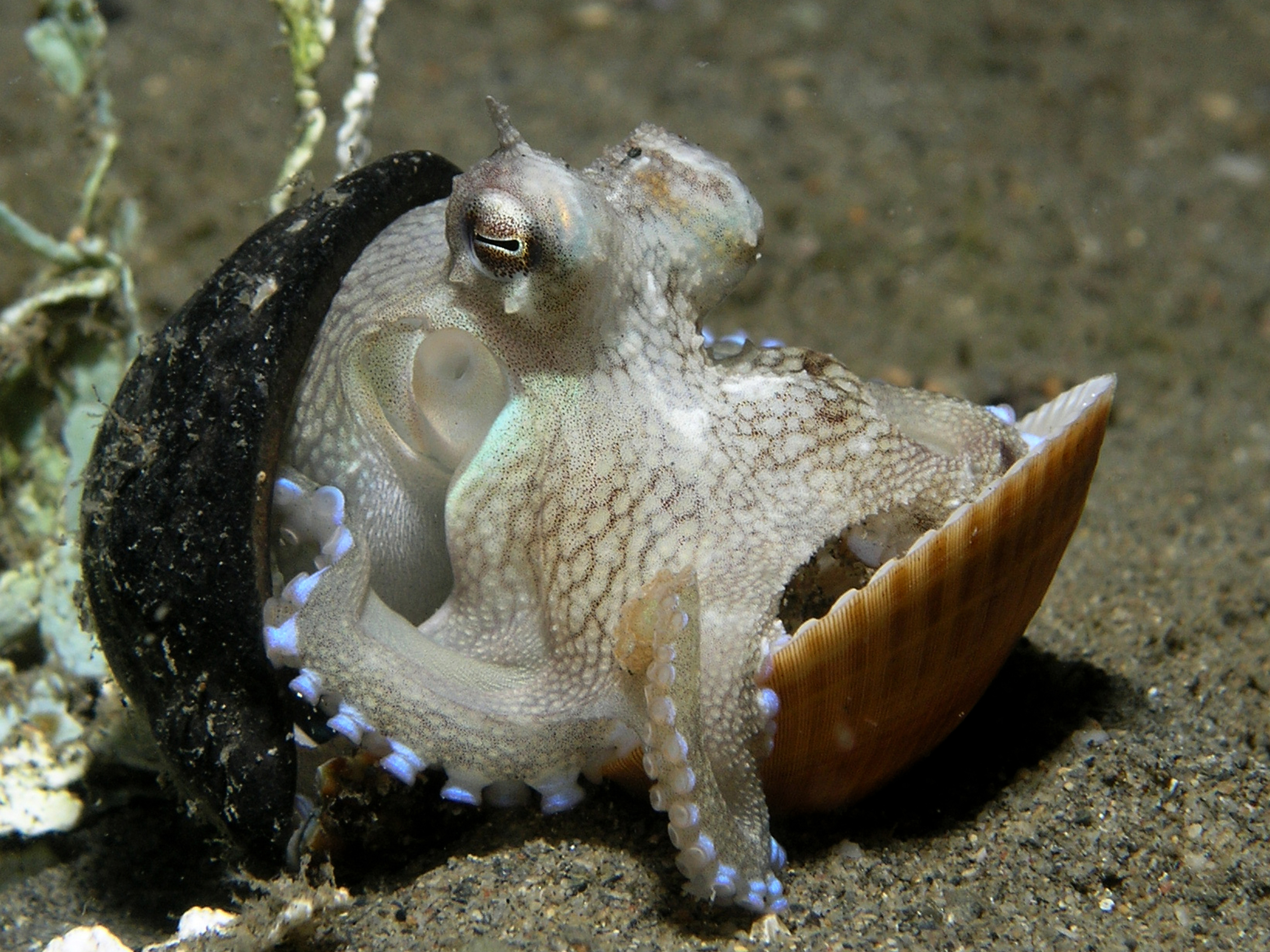
Octopus travelling with shells collected for protection

Octopuses are highly intelligent, possibly more so than any other order of invertebrates. The level of their intelligence and learning capability are debated, but maze and problem-solving studies show they have both short- and long-term memory. Octopus have a highly complex nervous system, only part of which is localized in their brain. Two-thirds of an octopus's neurons are found in the nerve cords of their arms. Octopus arms show a variety of complex reflex actions that persist even when they have no input from the brain. Unlike vertebrates, the complex motor skills of octopuses are not organized in their brain using an internal somatotopic map of their body, instead using a non-somatotopic system unique to large-brained invertebrates. Some octopuses, such as the mimic octopus, move their arms in ways that emulate the shape and movements of other sea creatures.

In laboratory studies, octopuses can easily be trained to distinguish between different shapes and patterns. They reportedly use observational learning, although the validity of these findings is contested. Octopuses have also been observed to play: repeatedly releasing bottles or toys into a circular current in their aquariums and then catching them. Octopuses often escape from their aquarium and sometimes enter others. They have boarded fishing boats and opened holds to eat crabs. At least four specimens of the veined octopus (Amphioctopus marginatus) have been witnessed retrieving discarded coconut shells, manipulating them, and then reassembling them to use as shelter.

== Shamanistic and religious views ==
Shamanistic and other traditional cultures and folk tales speak of animal spirits and the consciousness of animals. In Jainism, the concept of jiva, which corresponds to soul or consciousness, is viewed as being present in all entities, including living organisms, such as plants, animals and insects, and inert matter. This cosmology establishes a universal kinship among all life forms; consequently, Jains adhere to nonviolence (ahimsa), prohibiting the harm or destruction of any living being.

== Researchers ==
Some contributors to relevant research on animal consciousness include:

- Marc Bekoff
- Jonathan Birch
- Peter Carruthers
- Antonio Damasio
- Marian Stamp Dawkins
- Frans de Waal
- Shaun Gallagher
- Gordon G. Gallup
- Donald Griffin
- Nicholas Humphrey
- Christof Koch
- Thomas Nagel
- Irene Pepperberg
- Bernard Rollin
- Jeffrey M. Schwartz
- Jakob von Uexküll

== See also ==
- Animal cognition
- Animal communication
- Animal resistance
- Animal rights
- Animal rights by country or territory
- Anthropocentrism
- Artificial consciousness
- Awareness
- Biosemiotics
- Brain in a vat
- Cognitive ethology
- Consciousness
- Descartes' Error
- Emotion in animals
- Encephalization quotient
- Epiphenomenalism
- Explanatory gap
- Ethics of uncertain sentience
- Externalism
- Hard problem of consciousness
- Human–animal communication
- Internalism and externalism
- Meat paradox
- Mind–body problem
- Neural correlates of consciousness
- Philosophy of mind
- Plant perception (paranormal)
- Problem of other minds
- Self-awareness in animals
- Sentience
- Sentientism
- Sentient beings (Buddhism)
- Speciesism
- Spindle neuron
- Veganism
- Zoosemiotics
