= Animal machine =

Philosophical concept of animals as automata

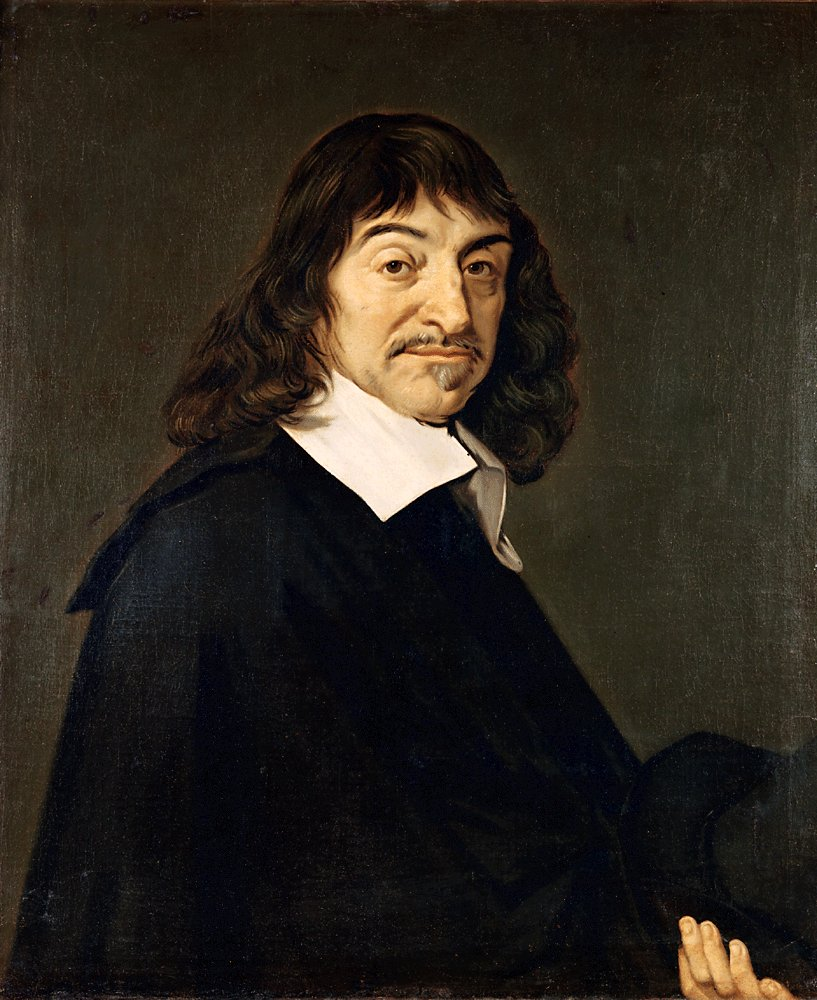
René Descartes, whose account of animals as automata is closely associated with the doctrine of the animal machine

Animal machine (French: bête-machine), also known as animal automatism, is a concept in early modern philosophy associated especially with René Descartes. In Descartes' account, non-human animals are automata whose behaviour can be explained by bodily mechanism rather than by reason or an immaterial soul. The doctrine formed part of his wider philosophy of mind–body dualism, in which humans alone possess minds capable of thought and language.

Descartes developed this view against the Aristotelian and Scholastic tradition, which explained life in terms of soul and final causes. His account became a well-known part of Cartesian natural philosophy and drew criticism from later philosophers and writers, especially on the question of animal sensation and suffering.

== Historical context ==
Descartes rejected the view that living beings act for intrinsic ends. Instead, he held that bodily processes could be explained through the motion and interaction of matter. On this basis, he treated animal life as a matter of mechanism rather than soul.

According to Deborah J. Brown, Descartes had developed the doctrine of animal automatism by 1619 and continued to defend it throughout his life, including in his correspondence with Henry More in the late 1640s.

== Descartes' account ==
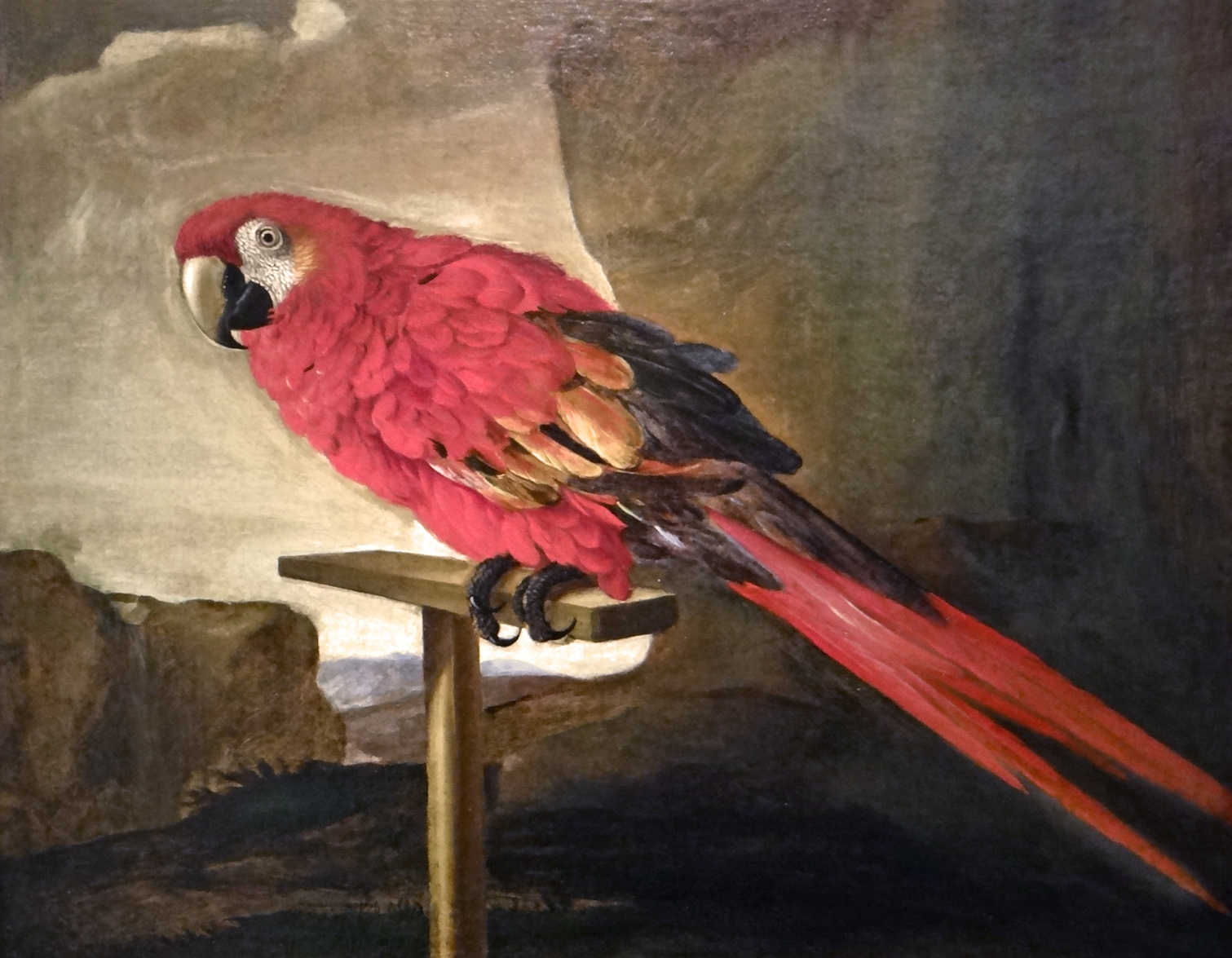
Descartes used parrots to argue that imitation of speech is not the same as language or understanding

Descartes compared animals to hydraulic automata, such as the moving statues in the gardens at Saint-Germain-en-Laye. He described the animal body as a system of nerves, muscles, and animal spirits operating by purely physical means. On this account, sensation and movement in animals did not require thought or reason.

He also proposed two tests that, in his view, distinguished humans from animals. The first was the capacity for genuine language, meaning the ability to produce new and meaningful speech. The second was the ability to act with general adaptability across different situations. Descartes held that animals failed both tests. Their sounds and actions, however complex, were taken to be the products of bodily organisation rather than understanding.

== Metaphysical and theological implications ==
Descartes held that only humans possess immortal, immaterial souls created directly by God. Animals, by contrast, were explained in terms of bodily structure and the movement of animal spirits. This view marked a sharp distinction between humans and other animals within Cartesian philosophy.

At the same time, Descartes acknowledged similarities between human and animal bodies, including shared organs and physiological processes. He also allowed that animals could acquire habits and show some flexibility in behaviour, but he treated these as mechanical changes in bodily arrangement rather than as evidence of thought.

== Criticism and reassessment ==
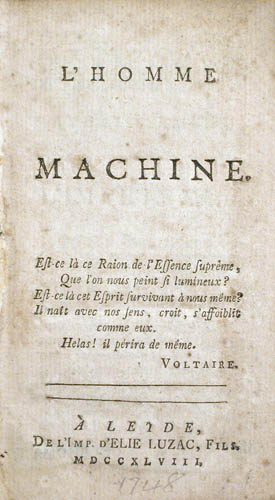
Title page of Julien Offray de La Mettrie's L'Homme Machine (1747), which extended the machine analogy from animals to humans

=== Early criticism ===
Descartes' account of animals was criticised during his lifetime and afterwards. Brown identifies critics including Pierre Gassendi, Nicolas Malebranche, and the Cambridge Platonists. Ralph Cudworth, for example, argued that animals possess a kind of soul marked by self-activity and sensibility, and so should not be treated as equivalent to inanimate matter.

Brown also notes that practices such as animal trials in premodern Europe suggest that animals were often treated as beings capable of agency and responsibility, which stood at odds with Descartes' account.

Opposition to the doctrine also appeared in religious writing. In the 1760 sermon Universal Charity, the preacher rejected the view that animals are "mere Machines and Pieces of Clock-work, without Sense, Perception, or Consciousness".

=== Enlightenment materialism ===
In the 18th century, Julien Offray de La Mettrie extended the machine analogy to humans. In L'Homme Machine ("Man a Machine"; 1747), he rejected Cartesian dualism and argued that thought and consciousness arise from bodily organisation.

=== Animal ethics ===
In modern animal ethics, Descartes has often been criticised for denying animal consciousness or sentience. In Animal Liberation (1975), Peter Singer called Descartes' position the "absolute nadir" of Western thought about animals. Tom Regan also discussed Descartes critically in The Case for Animal Rights (1983). Anita Guerrini notes that in 1982 a member of the Animal Liberation Front defaced a portrait of Descartes at the Royal Society in protest.

=== Reassessment ===
In 1978, John Cottingham argued that Descartes may not have denied all forms of animal sensation. Cottingham distinguished between cogitatio ("thought") and sensus ("sensation"), and pointed to passages in which Descartes described animals as expressing fear, hunger, and anger. He concluded that Descartes' position on animal feeling was less straightforward than later summaries often suggest.

=== Continuing influence ===
The doctrine of the animal machine continues to appear in discussions of animal consciousness, the moral status of animals, and the history of theories of mind and mechanism.

== See also ==
- Animal cognition
- Animal consciousness
- Animal rights
- Cartesian dualism
- Ethics of uncertain sentience
- Mind–body problem
- Pain in animals
- Philosophy of mind
- Mechanism (philosophy)
- Sentience
