= Mirror test =

Animal self-awareness test

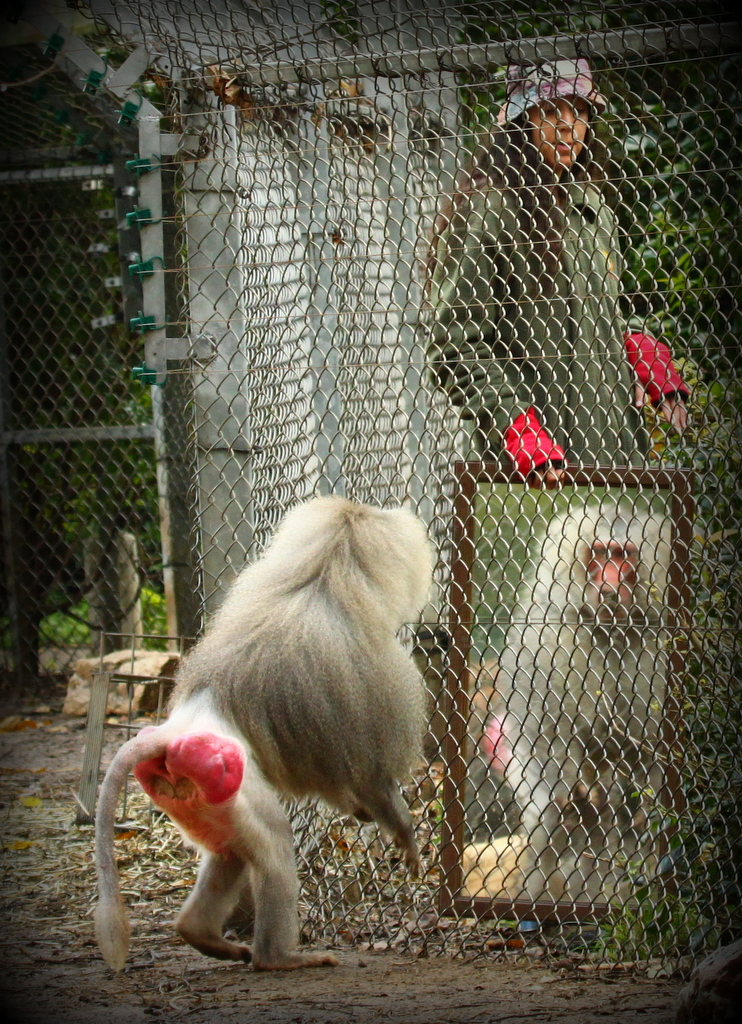
The hamadryas baboon is one of many primate species that has been administered the mirror test.

The mirror test—sometimes called the mark test, mirror self-recognition (MSR) test, red spot technique, or rouge test—is a behavioral technique developed in 1970 by American psychologist Gordon Gallup Jr. to determine whether an animal possesses the ability of visual self-recognition. In this test, an animal is anesthetized and then marked (e.g. paint or sticker) on an area of the body the animal normally cannot see (e.g. forehead). When the animal recovers from the anesthetic, it is given access to a mirror. If it subsequently touches or examines the mark on its own body, this behavior is interpreted as evidence that the animal recognizes its reflection as an image of itself, rather than another animal.

The MSR test has become a standard approach for evaluating physiological and cognitive self-awareness. However, several critiques have been raised that challenge the test's validity. Some studies have questioned Gallup's findings; others have discovered that animals exhibit self-awareness in ways not captured by the test, such as differentiating between their own songs and scents and those of others. More recently, researchers have found evidence suggesting that self-recognition has more to do with experience and learning than innate ability. One study found that macaque monkeys trained with mirrors passed the mirror test.

== Method and history ==
The inspiration for the mirror test comes from an anecdote about Charles Darwin and a captive orangutan. While visiting the London Zoo in 1838, Darwin observed an orangutan named Jenny throwing a tantrum after being teased with an apple by her keeper. This started him thinking about the subjective experience of an orangutan. He also watched Jenny gaze into a mirror and noted the possibility that she recognized herself in the reflection.

In 1970, Gordon Gallup Jr. experimentally investigated the possibility of self-recognition with two male and two female wild preadolescent chimpanzees (Pan troglodytes), none of which had presumably seen a mirror previously. Each chimpanzee was put into a room by itself for two days. Next, a full-length mirror was placed in the room for a total of 80 hours at periodically decreasing distances. A multitude of behaviors was recorded upon introducing the mirrors to the chimpanzees. Initially, the chimpanzees made threatening gestures at their images, ostensibly seeing their reflections as threatening. Eventually, the chimps used their reflections for self-directed responding behaviors, such as grooming parts of their body previously not observed without a mirror, picking their noses, making faces, and blowing bubbles at their reflections.

Gallup expanded the study by manipulating the chimpanzees' appearance and observing their reaction to their reflection in the mirror. Gallup anesthetized the chimps and then painted a red alcohol-soluble dye on the eyebrow ridge and the top half of the opposite ear. When the dye dried, it had virtually no olfactory or tactile cues. Gallup then removed the mirror before returning the chimpanzees to the cage. After regaining full consciousness, he recorded the frequency with which the chimps spontaneously touched the marked areas of skin. After 30 minutes, the mirror was reintroduced into the cage, and the frequency of touching the marked areas was again determined. With the mirror present, the frequency increased from four to ten, compared to only one when the mirror had been removed. The chimpanzees sometimes visually or olfactorily inspected their fingers after touching the marks. Other mark-directed behavior included turning and adjusting the body to better view the mark in the mirror or tactile examination of the mark with an appendage while viewing the mirror.

An essential aspect of the classical mark test (or rouge test) is that the mark/dye is nontactile, preventing attention from being drawn to the marking through additional perceptual cues (somesthesis). For this reason, animals in the majority of classical tests are anesthetized. Some tests use a tactile marker. If the creature stares unusually long at the part of its body with the mark or tries to rub it off, then it is said to pass the test.

Animals that are considered to be able to recognize themselves in a mirror typically progress through four stages of behavior when facing a mirror:

1. social responses
2. physical inspection (e.g., looking behind the mirror)
3. repetitive mirror-testing behavior
4. realization of seeing themselves

The rouge test was also done by Michael Lewis and Jeanne Brooks-Gunn in 1979 for the purpose of self-recognition with human mothers and their children.

== Implication and alternate explanations ==
The default implication drawn from Gallup's test is that those animals who pass the test possess some form of self-recognition. However, a number of authors have suggested alternative explanations of a pass. For example, Povinelli suggests that the animal may see the reflection as some odd entity that it is able to control through its own movements. When the reflected entity has a mark on it, then the animal can remove the mark or alert the reflected entity to it using its own movements to do so. Critically, this explanation does not assume that the animals necessarily see the reflected entity as "self".

== Criticism ==
The MSR test has been criticized for several reasons, in particular because it may result in false negative findings.

=== Perception ===
It may be of limited value when applied to species that primarily use senses other than vision. Mirrors are designed to work with humans' vision. Some biologists suggest that humans have some of the best eyesight amongst animals, exceeding the overwhelming majority in daylight settings, though a many species have better or more extensive visual capacities. By contrast, dogs use smell as much as, or more than, vision. This could explain dogs' behavior when presented with a mirror. Biologist Marc Bekoff developed a scent-based paradigm using dog urine to test if his dog would recognize his own odor, and his dog did seem to do so, even if it has been moved. Dog cognition researcher Alexandra Horowitz formalized Bekoff's idea in a controlled experiment, first reported in 2016 and published in 2017. She compared the dogs' behavior when examining their own and others' odors, and also when examining their own odor with an added smell "mark" analogous to the visual mark in MSR tests. These subjects not only discriminated their own odor from that of other dogs, as Bekoff had found, but also spent more time investigating their own odor "image" when it was modified, as subjects who pass the MSR test do. A 2016 study suggested an ethological approach, the "Sniff test of self-recognition (STSR)" which did not shed light on different ways of checking for self-recognition. Dogs also show self-awareness in the size and movement of their bodies. Garter snakes, a relatively social snake species, have also passed an odor based "mirror" test.

=== Social motivation ===
Another concern with the MSR test is that some species quickly respond aggressively to their mirror reflection as if it were a threatening conspecific, thereby preventing the animal from calmly considering what the reflection actually represents. This may be why monkeys fail the MSR test.

=== Disinterest ===
In an MSR test, animals may not recognise the mark as abnormal, or may not be sufficiently motivated to react to it. However, this does not mean they are unable to recognize themselves. In other words, the MSR test may be sufficient for self-recognition, but failing the MSR test does not prove that the animal does not recognize themselves. For example, in an MSR test conducted on three elephants, only one elephant passed the test, but the two elephants that failed still demonstrated behaviors that can be interpreted as self-recognition. The researchers commented that the elephants might not have touched the mark because it was not important enough to them. Similarly, lesser apes infrequently engage in self-grooming, which may explain their failure to touch a mark on their heads in the mirror test. In response to the question of the subject's motivation to clean, another study modified the test by introducing child subjects to a doll with a rouge spot under its eye and asking the child to help clean the doll. After establishing that the mark was abnormal and to be cleaned, the doll was put away and the test continued. This modification increased the number of self-recognisers.

=== Ambiguity ===
Frans de Waal, a biologist and primatologist at Emory University, has stated that self-awareness is not binary, and the mirror test should not be relied upon as a sole indicator of self-awareness, though it is a good test to have. Different animals adapt to the mirror in different ways.

== Non-human animals ==
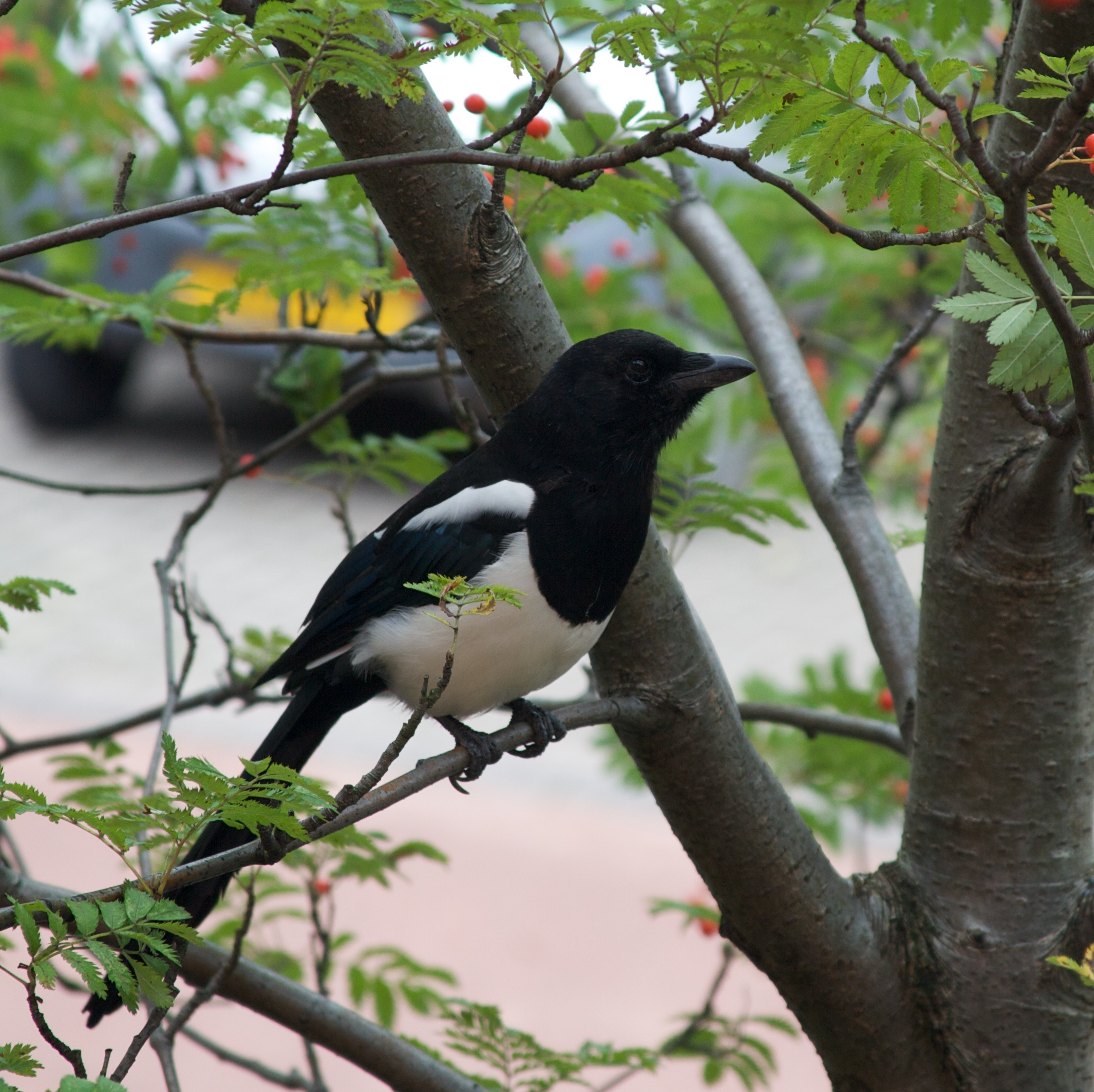
European magpies have demonstrated mirror self-recognition.

Several studies using a wide range of species have investigated the occurrence of spontaneous, mark-directed behavior when given a mirror, as originally proposed by Gallup. Most marked animals given a mirror initially respond with social behavior, such as aggressive displays, and continue to do so during repeated testing. Only a few species have touched or directed behavior toward the mark, thereby passing the classic MSR test.

Findings in MSR studies are not always conclusive. Even in chimpanzees, the species most studied and with the most convincing findings, clear-cut evidence of self-recognition is not obtained in all individuals tested. Prevalence is about 75% in young adults and considerably less in young and aging individuals.

Until the 2008 study on magpies, self-recognition was thought to reside in the neocortex area of the brain. However, this brain region is absent in nonmammals. Self-recognition may be a case of convergent evolution, where similar evolutionary pressures result in similar behaviors or traits, although species arrive at them by different routes, and the underlying mechanism may be different.

=== Animals that have passed ===
==== Mammals ====
===== Cetaceans =====
- Bottlenose dolphin (Tursiops truncatus): Researchers in a study on two male bottlenose dolphins observed their reactions to mirrors after having a mark placed on them. Reactions such as decreased delay in approaching the mirror, repetitious head circling and close viewing of the eye or genital region that had been marked were reported as evidence of MSR in these species.
- Killer whale (Orcinus orca): Killer whales and false killer whales (Pseudorca crassidens) may be able to recognise themselves in mirrors.

===== Equines =====
- Horse (Equus ferus caballus): an experiment found eleven out of 14 horses tried to rub coloured marks off their own cheeks after they discovered them in a mirror.

===== Primates =====
- Bonobo (Pan paniscus)
- Bornean orangutan (Pongo pygmaeus): However, mirror tests with an infant (2-year-old), male orangutan failed to reveal self-recognition.
- Chimpanzee (Pan troglodytes): However, mirror tests with an infant (11 months old) male chimpanzee failed to reveal self-recognition. Two young chimpanzees showed retention of MSR after one year without access to mirrors.
- Western gorilla (Gorilla gorilla): Findings for western gorillas have been mixed, more so than for the other great apes. At least four studies have reported that gorillas failed to show self-recognition. However, other studies have shown self-recognition in captive gorillas with extensive human contact. Such gorillas show less aversion to direct eye contact than wild gorillas. In wild gorillas, as in many other animals, prolonged direct eye contact is an aggressive gesture, and gorillas may fail the mirror test because they deliberately avoid closely examining or making eye contact with their reflections. Gorillas who have passed the MSR were habituated to the mirror before testing and were not subject to anesthesia during the marking process. Koko was among the gorillas who passed the MSR test under these circumstances.

===== Proboscidea =====
- Asian elephant (Elephas maximus): In a study performed in 2006, three female Asian elephants were exposed to a large mirror to investigate their responses. Visible marks and invisible sham-marks were applied to the elephants' heads to test whether they would pass the MSR test. One of the elephants showed mark-directed behavior, though the other two did not. An earlier study failed to find MSR in two Asian elephants; it was claimed this was because the mirror was too small.

===== Rodents =====
- House mouse (Mus musculus)

==== Birds ====
Video of the responses of a European magpie in an MSR test: The magpie repeatedly attempts to remove the marks.

- Eurasian magpie (Pica pica): The Eurasian magpie is the first non-mammal to have been found to pass the mirror test. In 2008, researchers applied a small red, yellow, or black sticker to the throat of five Eurasian magpies, where they could be seen by the bird only by using a mirror. The birds were then given a mirror. The feel of the sticker on their throats did not seem to alarm the magpies. However, when the birds with colored stickers glimpsed themselves in the mirror, they scratched at their throats—a clear indication that they recognised the image in the mirror as their own. Those that received a black sticker, invisible against the black neck feathers, did not react. In 2020, researchers attempted to closely replicate the 2008 study with a larger number of magpies, and failed to confirm the results of the 2008 study. The researchers stated that while these results did not disprove the 2008 study, the failure to replicate indicated the results of the original study should be treated with caution.
- Indian house crow (Corvus splendens): House crows were found to pass the mirror test in 2019. Six wild-caught crows had a red or yellow mark applied to their throat, then given a mirror. Their reactions were then compared to behaviour exhibited when the mark was applied in absence of a mirror, and when a black mark — not visible against the black throat — was applied both with and without a mirror. Four of the six birds displayed mark-directed behaviour spontaneously when first shown a mirror. The behaviours of these birds were then compared; the birds showed statistically increased levels of plumage ruffling and head shaking in the mark-mirror trials. Another study done on five house crows failed to replicate the result, to which they list several experimental differences, such as length of mirror and mark exposure and sticker weight. They additionally note that only two of the four crows that exhibited mark-directed behaviour in the original experiment did so at a high frequency, and that of the other two, one was preening at high levels during mirror exposure without a mark— suggesting that any perceived mark-directed behaviours observed could be a part of general preening behaviour. These authors conclude that under their paradigm, house crows do not appear to pass the mark test, but also emphasize the high level of variability in results from the mark test and the necessity for testing to be done with larger sample sizes.
- Some pigeons can pass the mirror test after training in the prerequisite behaviors. In 1981, American psychologist B. F. Skinner found that pigeons are capable of passing a highly modified mirror test after extensive training. In the experiment, a pigeon was trained to look in a mirror to find a response key behind it, which the pigeon then turned to peck to obtain food. Thus, the pigeon learned to use a mirror to find critical elements of its environment. Next, the pigeon was trained to peck at dots placed on its feathers; food was, again, the consequence of touching the dot. The latter training was accomplished in the absence of the mirror. The final test was placing a small bib on the pigeon—enough to cover a dot placed on its lower belly. A control period without the mirror present yielded no pecking at the dot. When the mirror was revealed, the pigeon became active, looked in the mirror and then tried to peck on the dot under the bib. However, untrained pigeons have never passed the mirror test.

==== Fish ====
- Bluestreak cleaner wrasse (Labroides dimidiatus): According to a study done in 2019, cleaner wrasses were the first fish observed to pass the mirror test. The bluestreak cleaner wrasse is a tiny tropical reef cleaner fish. Cleaner fish have an adapted evolutionary behavior in which they remove parasites and dead tissue from larger fish. When put through the mirror test, using a benign brown gel injected into the skin of the fish, and resembling a parasite, the cleaner wrasse showed all the behaviors of passing through the phases of the test. When provided with a colored tag in a modified mark test, the fish attempted to scrape off this tag by scraping their bodies on the side of the mirror. However, Gordon Gallup believes the cleaner wrasses' behavior can be attributed to something other than recognizing itself in a mirror. Gallup has argued that a cleaner wrasse's job in life is to be aware of ectoparasites on the bodies of other fish, so it would be hyper aware of the fake parasite that it noticed in the mirror, perhaps seeing it as a parasite that it needed to clean off of a different fish. The authors of the study retort that because the fish checked itself in the mirror before and after the scraping, this means that the fish has self-awareness and recognizes that its reflection belongs to its own body. The cleaner wrasses, when tested, spent a large amount of time with the mirror when they were first getting acquainted with it, without any training. Importantly, the cleaner wrasses performed scraping behavior with the colored mark, and they did not perform the same scraping behavior without the colored mark in the presence of the mirror, nor when they were with the mirror and had a transparent mark. Following various objections, the researchers published a follow-up study in 2022, where they did the mirror test on a larger sample of wrasses and experimented with several marking techniques. The new results "increase[d] [the researchers'] confidence that cleaner fish indeed pass the mark test", although wrasses attempted to scrape off the mark only when it resembled a parasite. Another study in 2024 found that cleaner wrasse that initially showed aggression to photographs 10% larger and 10% smaller than themselves ceased confrontation with 10% larger photographs upon encountering their reflection.
- Giant oceanic manta ray (Mobula birostris): In 2016 a modified mirror test done on two captive manta rays showed that they exhibited behavior associated with self-awareness (i.e. contingency checking and unusual self-directed behavior).

==== Crustaceans ====
- Atlantic ghost crab (Ocypode quadrata): A 2023 study found that these crabs seem to be capable of recognizing themselves in a mirror. The study's author concluded that the data indicate that the crabs have "a rudimentary form of self-awareness".

==== Cephalopods ====
- Mimic octopus (Thaumoctopus mimicus): A 2025 video claims it shows a mimic octopus recognising itself in a mirror, but the evidence is not solid.

==== Insects ====
- Myrmica rubra, Myrmica ruginodis, and Myrmica sabuleti: A 2015 study found that individual ants of these three ant species would attempt to clean themselves after being exposed to a mirror and seeing a blue dot on their bodies.

=== Animals that have failed ===
Some animals that have reportedly failed the classic (visual) MSR test include:

==== Mammals ====
===== Carnivora =====
- Sea lions (Zalophus californianus)
- Giant panda (Ailuropoda melanoleuca): In one study, 34 captive giant pandas of a wide range of ages were tested. None of the pandas responded to the mark and many reacted aggressively towards the mirror, causing the researchers to consider the pandas viewed their reflection as a conspecific.
- Dogs (Canis familiaris): Dogs either treat the image as another animal, or come to ignore it completely - but see the olfactory mirror test for a species-specific version.
- Cats (Felis catus).

===== Primates =====
- Stump-tailed macaque (Macaca arctoides)
- Crab-eating macaque (Macaca fascicularis)
- Black-and-white colobus (Colobus guereza)
- Hamadryas baboon (Papio hamadryas)
- Cotton-top tamarin (Saguinus oedipus)
- Chacma Baboon (Papio Ursius)
- Gray mouse lemur (Microcebus murinus)

==== Birds ====
- Grey parrot
- New Caledonian crow
- Jackdaw
- Great tit (Parus major)

==== Fish ====
- The Tanganyikan cichlid, or daffodil cichlid (Neolamprologus pulcher), are fish that are more strongly believed to have failed the mirror test than the aforementioned cleaner wrasses, based on a study done in 2017. Although not cleaner fish like the cleaner wrasses, these fish are typically regarded as socially intelligent and can recognize conspecifics in their social groups. Therefore, they would theoretically make good candidates for the mirror test, but they ended up failing. Similar to the cleaner wrasse, the Tanganyikan cichlid first exhibited signs of aggression towards the mirrored image. After a colored mark was injected, the researchers found no increased scraping or trying to remove the mark, and the cichlids did not observe the side with the mark any longer than it would have otherwise. This demonstrates a lack of contingency checking and means that the Tanganyikan cichlid did not pass the mirror test.

==== Cephalopods ====
- Octopodes oriented towards their image in a mirror, but no difference in their behaviour (as observed by humans) was seen in this condition when compared with a view of other octopodes.

=== Animals that may pass ===
==== Mammals ====
===== Primates =====
Gibbon (g. Hylobates, Symphalangus and Nomascus) have failed to show self-recognition in at least two tests. However, modified mirror tests with three species of gibbons (S. syndactylus, N. gabriellae, N. leucogenys) in 2000 showed convincing evidence of self-recognition even though the animals failed the standard version of the mirror test. Another study published in 2009 documents 12 cases of spontaneous self-recognition in front of the mirror by a pair of siamangs (Symphalangus syndactylus). Capuchin monkey (Cebus apella) did not pass in one test but recognized the reflection as special in another.

Rhesus macaque (Macaca mulatta) Though macaques failed the original mark test, they have been reported to exhibit other behaviours that indicate self-recognition. Rhesus macaques have been observed to use mirrors to study otherwise-hidden parts of their bodies, such as their genitals and implants in their heads. It has been suggested this demonstrates at least a partial self-awareness, although further study is needed.

===== Pigs =====
Pigs can use visual information seen in a mirror to find food. In a 2009 experiment, seven of the eight pigs who spent 5 hours with a mirror were able to find a bowl of food hidden behind a wall and revealed using a mirror. Pigs that had no experience with mirrors, looked behind the mirror for the food. BBC Earth also showed the food bowl test, and the "matching shapes to holes" test, in the Extraordinary Animals series.

There is evidence of self-recognition when presented with their reflections. So far, pigs have not been observed to pass the mirror mark test, however.

==== Birds ====
Adelie penguins did not react as they would to another bird, and when presented with a mirror, gestured as if to notice the reflection in the mirror. However, they did not interact with marks on their faces.

==== Fish ====
Two captive giant manta rays showed frequent, unusual and repetitive movements in front of a mirror, suggesting contingency checking. They also showed unusual self-directed behaviors when exposed to the mirror. Manta rays have the largest brains of all fish. In 2016, Csilla Ari tested captive manta rays at the Atlantis Aquarium in the Bahamas by exposing them to a mirror. The manta rays appeared to be extremely interested in the mirror. They behaved strangely in front the mirror, including doing flips and moving their fins. They also blew bubbles. They did not interact with the reflection as if it were another manta ray; they did not try to socialize with it. However, only an actual mirror test can determine if they actually recognize their own reflections, or if they are just demonstrating exploratory behavior. A classic mirror test has yet to be done on manta rays.

Another fish that may pass the mirror test is the common archerfish, Toxotes chatareus. A study in 2016 showed that archerfish can discriminate between human faces. Researchers showed this by testing the archerfish, which spit a stream of water at an image of a face when they recognized it. The archerfish would be trained to expect food when it spat at a certain image. When the archerfish was shown images of other human faces, the fish did not spit. They only spit for the image that they recognized. Archerfish normally, in the wild, use their spitting streams to knock down prey from above into the water below. The study showed that archerfish could be trained to recognize a three-dimensional image of one face compared to an image of a different face and would spit at the face when they recognized it. The archerfish were even able to continue recognizing the image of the face even when it was rotated 30, 60 and 90°.

== Humans ==
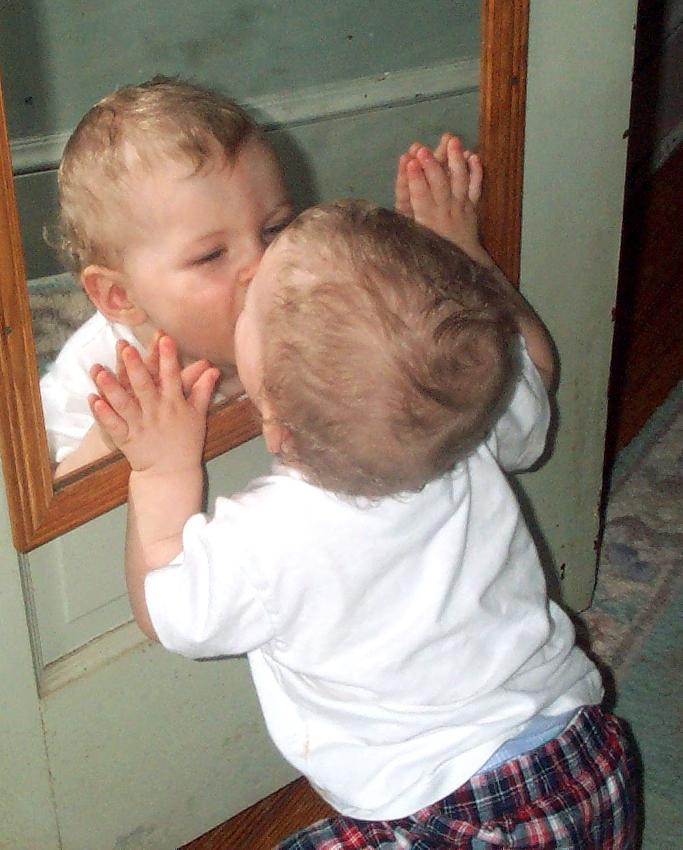
A human child exploring his reflection

The rouge test is a version of the mirror test used with human children. Using rouge makeup, an experimenter surreptitiously places a dot on the face of the child. The children are then placed in front of a mirror and their reactions are monitored; depending on the child's development, distinct categories of responses are demonstrated. This test is widely cited as the primary measure for mirror self-recognition in human children.

There is criticism that passing a rouge test may be culturally motivated, and that what is commonly thought about mirror self-recognition actually applies only to children of Western countries. A study from 2010 tested children from rural communities in Kenya, Fiji, Saint Lucia, Grenada and Peru, as well as urban United States and rural Canada. The majority of children from the US and Canada passed the MSR test, but fewer children from the other regions passed the MSR test. In the Kenya test, only 3% of children aged 18–72 months touched the mark. In the Fiji test, none of the children aged 36–55 months touched the mark. The other non-Western rural children scored much better, but still markedly worse than their Western counterparts.

=== Developmental reactions ===
In a study in 1972, from the ages of 6 to 12 months, children typically saw a "sociable playmate" in the mirror's reflection. Self-admiring and embarrassment usually began at 12 months, and at 14 to 20 months, most children demonstrated avoidance behaviors. By 20 to 24 months, self-recognition climbed to 65%. Children did so by evincing mark-directed behavior; they touched their own noses or tried to wipe the marks off. In another study, in 1974, at 18 months, half of children recognized the reflection in the mirror as their own.

Self-recognition in mirrors apparently is independent of familiarity with reflecting surfaces. In some cases, the rouge test has been shown to have differing results, depending on sociocultural orientation. For example, a Cameroonian Nso sample of infants 18 to 20 months of age had an extremely low amount of self-recognition outcomes at 3.2%. The study also found two strong predictors of self-recognition: object stimulation (maternal effort of attracting the attention of the infant to an object either person touched) and mutual eye contact. A strong correlation between self-concept and object permanence have also been demonstrated using the rouge test.

=== Implications ===
The rouge test is a measure of self-concept; the child who touches the rouge on their own nose upon looking into a mirror demonstrates the basic ability to understand self-awareness. Animals, young children, and people who have gained sight after being blind from birth sometimes react to their reflection in the mirror as though it were another individual.

Theorists have remarked on the significance of this period in a child's life. For example, psychoanalyst Jacques Lacan used a similar test in marking the mirror stage when growing up. Current views of the self in psychology position the self as playing an integral part in human motivation, cognition, affect, and social identity.

== Robots ==
In 2012, early steps were taken to make a robot pass the mirror test.

== See also ==
- Animal consciousness
- Cognitive tests
- Embodied cognition
- Encephalization quotient
- Face perception
- Self-agency
- Visual perception
- Visual system
