= Man a Machine =

1748 book by Julien Offray de La Mettrie

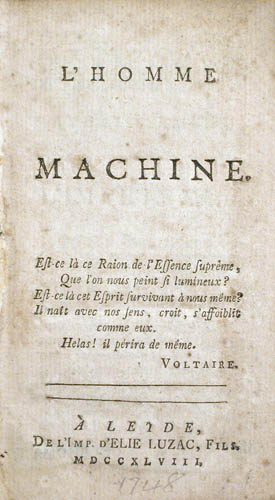
Title page of a 1748 French edition.

Man a Machine (French: L'homme machine) is a work of materialist philosophy by the 18th-century French physician and philosopher Julien Offray de La Mettrie, first published in 1747. In this work, de La Mettrie extends Descartes' argument that animals are mere automatons, or machines, to human beings. He denies dualism and the existence of the soul as a substance separate from matter.

== Writing on the effects of physical conditions on the soul ==
La Mettrie cites how the body and soul are one in sleep, how humans must nourish their bodies, and the intense effects of drugs on both the body and the soul, or mind, noting that "diverse states of the soul are always correlated with those of the body."

== Materialism in relation to evolution and quantum mechanism ==
Karl Popper discusses de La Mettrie's claim in relation to evolution and quantum mechanics.

Yet the doctrine that man is a machine was argued most forcefully in 1751, long before the theory of evolution became generally accepted, by de La Mettrie; and the theory of evolution gave the problem an even sharper edge, by suggesting there may be no clear distinction between living matter and dead matter. And, in spite of the victory of the new quantum theory, and the conversion of so many physicists to indeterminism, de La Mettrie's doctrine that man is a machine has perhaps more defenders than before among physicists, biologists and philosophers; especially in the form of the thesis that man is a computer.

== See also ==
- Animal machine
- Computational theory of mind
- Mind–body problem
