= Gordon G. Gallup =

American psychologist (1941–2026)

- Born: March 24, 1941; Denver, Colorado, U.S.
- Died: July 22, 2026 (aged 85); Albany, New York, U.S.
- Education: Washington State University
- Occupation: Psychologist
- Employer(s): Tulane University; University at Albany

Gordon G. Gallup Jr. (/ˈɡæləp/; March 24, 1941 – July 22, 2026) was an American psychologist and academic at the University at Albany's psychology department, known for his research in biopsychology.

== Early life and education ==
Gallup was born in Denver, Colorado, on March 24, 1941. He received his Ph.D. from Washington State University in 1968, after which he joined the faculty of the psychology department at Tulane University.

== Career ==
Gallup is best known for developing the mirror test, also called the mirror self-recognition test, or MSR, in 1970, which gauges self-awareness of animals. In 1975, Gallup moved to the University at Albany.

During his tenure at Tulane, Gallup also developed a research interest in tonic immobility, or "animal hypnosis," which he continued at the University at Albany. His later work on animal behavior focused on ethological approaches to the study of animal behavior under laboratory conditions, which he pursued with Susan Suarez in the 1980s.

From the 1990s onward, Gallup's research focused exclusively on human evolutionary psychology. Gallup's article entitled "Does Semen Have Antidepressant Properties?" attracted the attention of the media when it was published in 2002. Gallup commented, "I want to make it clear that we are not advocating that people abstain from using condoms. Clearly, an unwanted pregnancy or a sexually transmitted disease would more than offset any advantageous psychological effects of semen."

== Death ==
Gallup died in Albany, New York, on July 22, 2026, at the age of 85.

== Publications ==
- Gallup, Gordon G. (1970). "Chimpanzees: Self-Recognition". Science. 167 (3914): 86–87. Bibcode:1970Sci...167...86G. doi:10.1126/science.167.3914.86. PMID 4982211. S2CID 145295899.
- Gallup, Gordon G. (1977). "Self recognition in primates: A comparative approach to the bidirectional properties of consciousness". American Psychologist. 32 (5): 329–338. doi:10.1037/0003-066X.32.5.329.
- Chavanne, Tara J.; Gallup, Gordon G. (1998). "Variation in Risk Taking Behavior Among Female College Students as a Function of the Menstrual Cycle". Evolution and Human Behavior. 19 (1). Elsevier: 27–32. doi:10.1016/S1090-5138(98)00016-6.
- Gallup, Gordon G.; Burch, Rebecca L.; Platek, Steven M. (2002). "Does semen have antidepressant properties?". Archives of Sexual Behavior. 31 (3): 289–293. doi:10.1023/A:1015257004839. PMID 12049024. S2CID 1243406.
- Hughes, Susan M.; Dispenza, Franco; Gallup, Gordon G. (2004). "Ratings of voice attractiveness predict sexual behavior and body configuration". Evolution and Human Behavior. 25 (5): 295–304. CiteSeerX 10.1.1.322.7594. doi:10.1016/j.evolhumbehav.2004.06.001.
- Platek, Steven M; Burch, Rebecca L; Panyavin, Ivan S; Wasserman, Brett H; Gallup, Gordon G (2002). "Reactions to children's faces: Resemblance affects males more than females". Evolution and Human Behavior. 23 (3): 159–166. doi:10.1016/S1090-5138(01)00094-0.
- Hobbs, Dawn R.; Gallup, Gordon G. (2011). "Songs as a Medium for Embedded Reproductive Messages". Evolutionary Psychology. 9 (3): 390–416. doi:10.1177/147470491100900309. PMC 10426854. PMID 22947982.
