= Physiological prematurity =

The term physiological prematurity (also described as altriciality) refers to the fact that compared to most animals, humans are born in a premature biological state. Although sensory organs and skeletal and muscular systems are largely developed prenatally, human babies at the time of their birth are completely helpless and dependent on intensive care. This is in contrast to the maturity at birth found in other higher mammals (e.g. elephants, horses).

According to the Swiss biologist Adolf Portmann, it is a characteristic feature of humans that due to their early birth, many developmental processes do not happen in isolation, but embedded in a sociocultural environment. Due to their complete dependence, humans are particularly amenable for social interactions and their environmental condition, which, according to Portmann, is a precondition for cultural and intellectual learning.

Popularly called the fourth trimester of pregnancy, using a label coined by US pediatrician Harvey Karp in his book The Happiest Baby on the Block, the relative underdevelopment of human newborns compared to other primates is believed to be due to evolutionary pressures related to walking upright.
