= Julien Offray de La Mettrie =

French physician and philosopher (1709–1751)

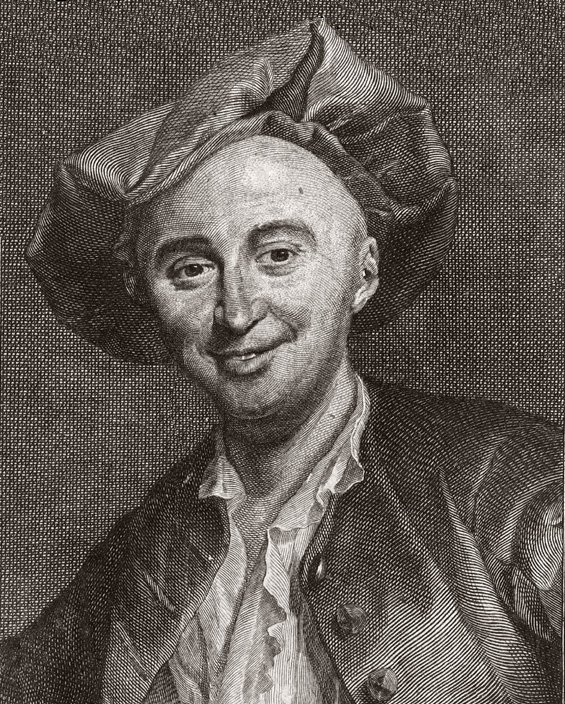
- Born: 23 November 1709; Saint-Malo, Province of Brittany, France
- Died: 11 November 1751 (aged 41); Berlin, Prussia

Education
- Education: University of Rennes

Philosophical work
- Era: 18th-century philosophy
- Region: Western philosophy
- School: French materialism
- Main interests: Mind–body problem
- Notable ideas: Mechanistic materialism

Julien Offray de La Mettrie (French: [ɔfʁɛ də la metʁi]; 23 November 1709 – 11 November 1751) was a French physician and philosopher, and one of the earliest of the French materialists of the Enlightenment. He is best known for his 1747 work L'homme machine (Man a Machine).

La Mettrie is most remembered for taking the position that humans are complex animals and no more have souls than other animals do. He considered that the mind is part of the body and that life should be lived so as to produce pleasure (hedonism). His views were so controversial that he had to flee France and settle in Berlin.

== Early life ==
La Mettrie was born at Saint-Malo in the Province of Brittany on November 23, 1709, and was the son of a prosperous textile merchant. His initial schooling took place in the colleges of Coutances and Caen. After attending the Collège du Plessis in Paris, he seemed to have acquired a vocational interest in becoming a clergyman, but after studying theology in the Jansenist schools for some years, his interests turned away from the Church. In 1725, La Mettrie entered the College d'Harcourt to study philosophy and natural science, probably graduating around 1728. At this time, D'Harcourt was pioneering the teaching of Cartesianism in France. In 1734, he went on to study under Hermann Boerhaave, a renowned physician who, similarly, had originally intended on becoming a clergyman. It was under Boerhaave that La Mettrie was influenced to try to bring changes to medical education in France.

== Medical career ==
After his studies at D'Harcourt, La Mettrie decided to take up the profession of medicine. A friend of the La Mettrie family, François-Joseph Hunauld, who was about to take the chair of anatomy at the Jardin du Roi, seems to have influenced him in this decision. For five years, La Mettrie studied at faculty of medicine in Paris, and enjoyed the mentorship of Hunauld.

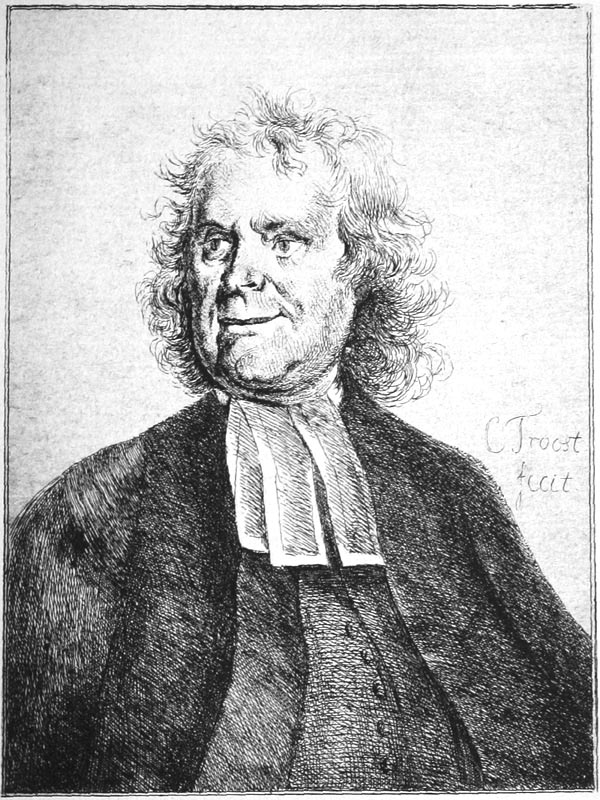
In Leiden, La Mettrie studied under the famous physician Herman Boerhaave (pictured above)

In 1733, however, he departed for Leiden to study under the famous Herman Boerhaave. His stay in Holland proved to be short but influential. In the following years, La Mettrie settled down to professional medical practice in his home region of Saint-Malo, disseminating the works and theories of Boerhaave through the publication and translation of several works. He married in 1739 but the marriage, which produced two children, proved an unhappy one. In 1742 La Mettrie left his family and travelled to Paris, where he obtained the appointment of surgeon to the Gardes Françaises regiment, taking part in several battles during the War of the Austrian Succession. This experience would instill in him a deep aversion to violence which is evident in his philosophical writings. Much of his time, however, was spent in Paris, and it is likely that during this time he made the acquaintance of Maupertuis and the Marquise de Châtelet.

It was in these years, during an attack of fever, that he made observations on himself with reference to the action of quickened blood circulation upon thought, which led him to the conclusion that mental processes were to be accounted for as the effects of organic changes in the brain and nervous system. This conclusion he worked out in his earliest philosophical work, the Histoire naturelle de l'âme (1745). So great was the outcry caused by its publication that La Mettrie was forced to quit his position with the French Guards, taking refuge in Leiden. There he developed his doctrines still more boldly and completely in L'Homme machine, a hastily written treatise based upon consistently materialistic and quasi-atheistic principles. La Mettrie's materialism was in many ways the product of his medical concerns, drawing on the work of 17th-century predecessors such as the Epicurean physician Guillaume Lamy.

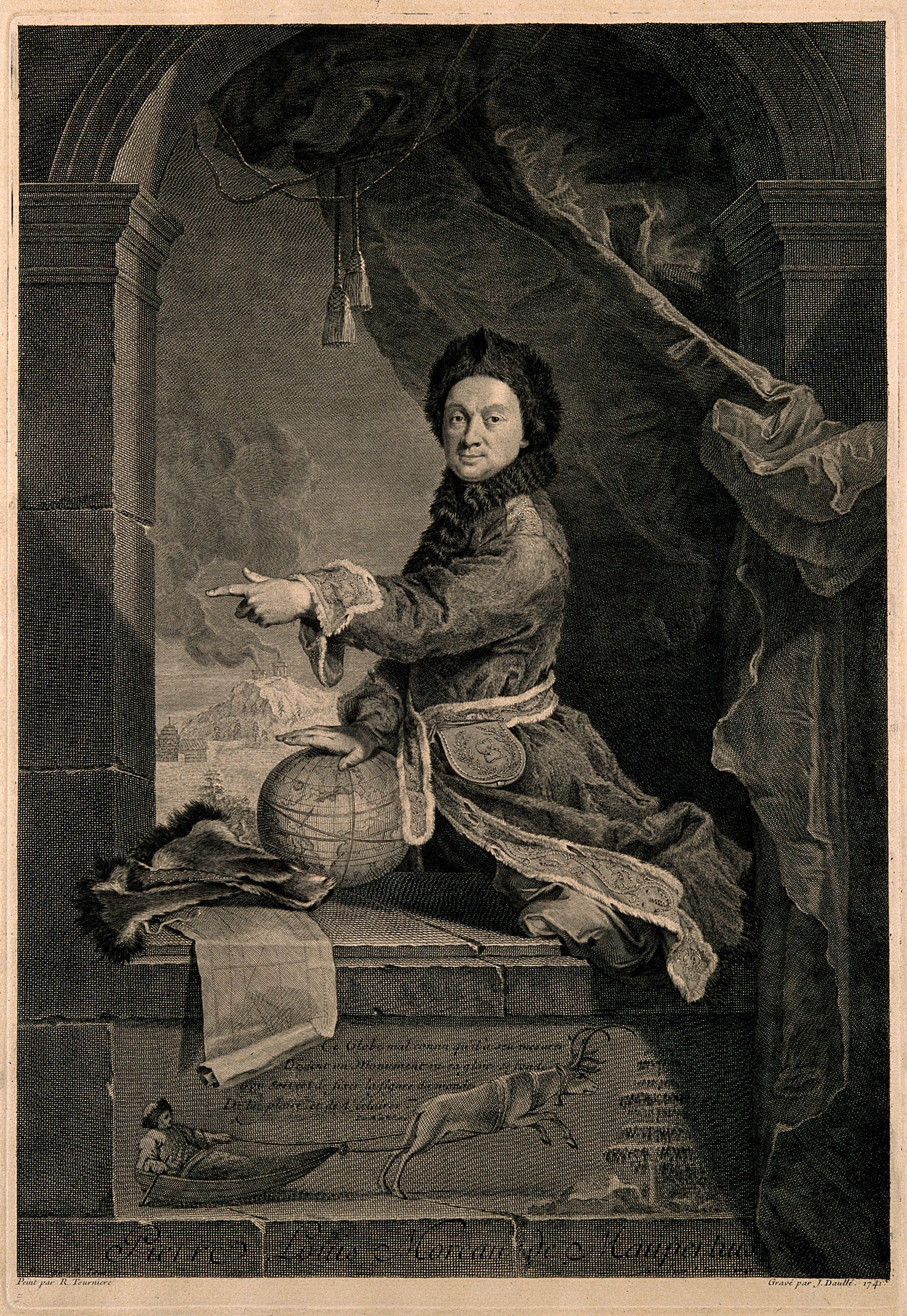
Pierre Louis Maupertuis, also a native of Saint-Malo, helped La Mettrie find refuge in Prussia.

The ethical implications of these principles would later be worked out in his Discours sur le bonheur; La Mettrie considered it his magnum opus. Here he developed his theory of remorse, i.e. his view about the inauspicious effects of the feelings of guilt acquired at early age during the process of enculturation. This was the idea which brought him the enmity of virtually all thinkers of the French Enlightenment, and a damnatio memoriae which was lifted only a century later by Friedrich Albert Lange in his Geschichte des Materialismus.

== Philosophy ==
Julien de La Mettrie is considered one of the most influential determinists of the eighteenth century. He believed that mental processes were caused by the body. He expressed these thoughts in his most important work Man a Machine. There he also expressed his belief that humans worked like a machine. This theory can be considered to build off the work of Descartes and his approach to the human body working as a machine. La Mettrie believed that man, body and mind, worked like a machine. Although he helped further Descartes's view of mechanization in explaining human bodily behavior, he argued against Descartes's dualistic view on the mind. His opinions were so strong that he stated that Descartes was actually a materialist in regards to the mind.

The philosopher David Skrbina considers La Mettrie an adherent of "vitalistic materialism":

To him, mind was a very real entity, and clearly it was embedded in a material cosmos. An obvious solution, therefore, was to see matter itself as inherently dynamic, capable of feeling, even intelligent. Motion and mind derive from some inherent powers of life or sentience that dwell in matter itself or in the organizational properties of matter. That view, sometimes called vitalistic materialism, is the one that LaMettrie—and later Diderot—adopted. Commentators often portray LaMettrie as a mechanist because it is assumed that anyone who denies the spiritual realm must see all things, and in particular all living things, as products of dead matter. It is quite common, even today, to equate materialism with mechanism. But, as has been noted, the two are logically independent. ...Though he obviously adopted the term ‘machine’ in his L’Homme Machine, it was in a specifically vitalistic sense.

=== Man and the animal ===
Prior to Man a Machine he published The Natural History of the Soul in 1745. He argued that humans were just complex animals. A great deal of controversy emerged due to his belief that "from animals to man there is no abrupt transition". He later built on that idea: he claimed that humans and animals were composed of organized matter. He believed that humans and animals were only different in regards to the complexity that matter was organized. He compared the differences between man and animal to those of high quality pendulum clocks and watches stating: "[Man] is to the ape, and to the most intelligent animals, as the planetary pendulum of Huygens is to a watch of Julien Le Roy". The idea that essentially no real difference between humans and animals existed was based on his findings that sensory feelings were present in animals and plants. While he did recognize that only humans spoke a language, he thought that animals were capable of learning a language. He used apes as an example, stating that if they were trained they would be "perfect [men]". He further expressed his ideas that man was not very different from animals by suggesting that we learn through imitation as do animals.

His beliefs about humans and animals were based on two types of continuity. The first being weak continuity, suggesting that humans and animals are made of the same things but are organized differently. His main emphasis however was on strong continuity, the idea that the psychology and behavior between humans and animals was not all that different.

=== Man a machine ===
La Mettrie believed that man worked like a machine due to mental thoughts depending on bodily actions. He then argued that the organization of matter at a high and complex level resulted in human thought. He did not believe in the existence of God. He rather chose to argue that the organization of humans was done to provide the best use of complex matter as possible.

La Mettrie arrived at this belief after finding that his bodily and mental illnesses were associated with each other. After gathering enough evidence, in medical and psychological fields, he published the book.

Some of the evidence La Mettrie presented was disregarded due to the nature of it. He argued that events such as a beheaded chicken running around, or a recently removed heart of an animal still working, proved the connection between the brain and the body. While theories did build off La Mettrie's, his works were not necessarily scientific. Rather, his writings were controversial and defiant.

=== Human nature ===
He further expressed his radical beliefs by asserting himself as a determinist, dismissing the use of judges. He disagreed with Christian beliefs and emphasized the importance of going after sensual pleasure, a hedonistic approach to human behavior. He further looked at human behavior by questioning the belief that humans have a higher sense of morality than animals. He noted that animals rarely tortured each other and argued that some animals were capable of some level of morality. He believed that as machines, humans would follow the law of nature and ignore their own interests for those of others.

=== Influence ===
La Mettrie most directly influenced Pierre Jean Georges Cabanis, a prominent French physician. He worked off La Mettrie's materialistic views but modified them in order to be not as extreme. La Mettrie's extreme beliefs were rejected strongly, but his work did help influence psychology, specifically behaviorism. His influence is seen in the reductionist approach of behavioral psychologists. Nonetheless, the backlash he received was so strong that many behaviorists knew very little to nothing about La Mettrie and rather built off other materialists with similar arguments.

Cybernetics and its applications to psychology are also consistent with La Mettrie's position.

However, currently the psychological school most clearly influenced by La Mettrie is cognitive science, including the philosophy of artificial intelligence, which proposes to build robots in the image and likeness of the human being and other living beings, and even analyze the human being based on the robot analogy.

== Later life ==
=== Journey to Prussia ===
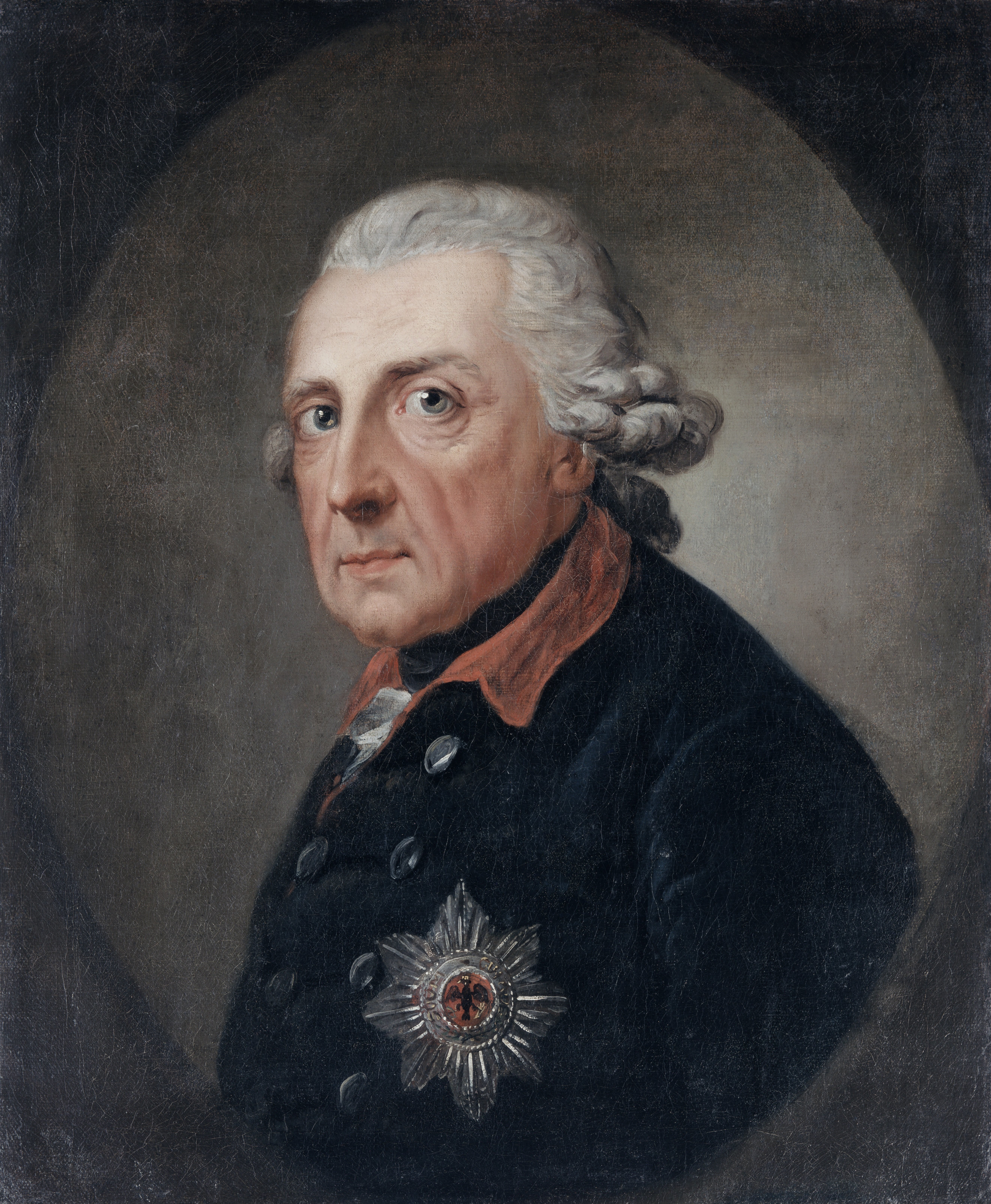
The court of Frederick the Great provided La Mettrie with a refuge in which to write and publish his works

La Mettrie's hedonistic and materialistic principles caused outrage even in the relatively tolerant Netherlands. So strong was the feeling against him that in 1748 he was compelled to leave for Berlin, where, thanks in part to the offices of Maupertuis, the Prussian king Frederick the Great not only allowed him to practice as a physician, but appointed him court reader. There La Mettrie wrote the Discours sur le bonheur (1748), which appalled leading Enlightenment thinkers such as Voltaire, Diderot and D'Holbach due to its explicitly hedonistic sensualist principles which prioritised the unbridled pursuit of pleasure above all other things.

=== Death ===
La Mettrie's celebration of sensual pleasure was said to have resulted in his early death. The French ambassador to Prussia, the comte de Tyrconnel, grateful to La Mettrie for curing him of an illness, held a feast in his honour. It was claimed that La Mettrie wanted to show either his power of gluttony or his strong constitution by devouring a large quantity of pâté de faisan aux truffes. As a result, he developed a gastric illness of some sort. Soon after he began suffering from a severe fever and eventually died.

Frederick the Great gave the funeral oration, which remains the major biographical source on La Mettrie's life. He declared: "La Mettrie died in the house of Milord Tirconnel, the French plenipotentiary, whom he had restored to life. It seems that the disease, knowing with whom it had to deal, was cunning enough to attack him first by the brain, in order to destroy him the more surely. A violent fever with fierce delirium came on. The invalid was obliged to have recourse to the science of his colleagues, but he failed to find the succor that his own skill had so often afforded as well to himself as to the public". In a letter to his sister, Frederick described him as a good devil and medic but a very bad author. He was survived by his wife and a 5-year-old daughter.

La Mettrie's collected Œuvres philosophiques appeared after his death in several editions, published in London, Berlin and Amsterdam.

== Works ==
=== Selected works ===
- Histoire Naturelle de l'Âme. 1745 (anon.)
- École de la Volupté. 1746, 1747 (anon.)
- Politique du Médecin de Machiavel. 1746 (anon.)
- L'Homme Machine. 1748 (anon.)
- L'Homme Plante. 1748 (anon.)
- Ouvrage de Pénélope ou Machiavel en Médecine. 1748 (pseudonym: Aletheius Demetrius)
- Discours sur le bonheur ou Anti-Sénèque [Traité de la vie heureuse, par Sénèque, avec un Discours du traducteur sur le même sujet]. 1748 (anon.)
- L'Homme plus que Machine. 1748 (anon.)
- Système d'Épicure. 1750 (anon.)
- L'Art de Jouir. 1751 (anon.)

=== Collected works ===
- Œuvres philosophiques, 2 vols., Paris: Fayard 1984, 1987 ISBN 2-213-01839-1; ISBN 978-2-213-01983-3
- [vol. 3] Ouvrage de Pénélope ou Machiavel en Médecine, Paris: Fayard 2002 ISBN 2-213-61448-2
- Œuvres philosophiques, 1 vol., Paris: Coda 2004 ISBN 2-84967-002-2

=== Critical editions of his major works ===
- Aram Vartanian (ed.): La Mettrie's L'homme machine. A Study in the Origins of an Idea, (Princeton: Princeton University Press, 1960)
- John F. Falvey (ed.): La Mettrie. Discours sur le bonheur in Studies on Voltaire and the Eighteenth Century, vol. cxxxiv (Banbury, Oxfordshire: The Voltaire Foundation, 1975)
- Ann Thomson (ed.): La Mettrie's Discours préliminaire. in Materialism and Society in the Mid-Eighteenth Century (Genève: Librairie Droz, 1981)
- Théo Verbeek (Ed.): Le Traité de l'Ame de La Mettrie, 2 vols. (Utrecht: OMI-Grafisch Bedrijf, 1988)
