= Higher consciousness =

Aspirational level of awareness

Higher consciousness (also called expanded consciousness) is a term that has been used in various ways to label particular states of consciousness or personal development. It may be used to describe a state of liberation from the limitations of self-concept or ego, as well as a state of mystical experience in which the perceived separation between the isolated self and the world or God is transcended. It may also refer to a state of increased alertness or awakening to a new perspective. While the concept has ancient roots, practices, and techniques, it has been significantly developed as a central notion in contemporary popular spirituality, including the hippie and New Age movements.

== Philosophy ==
=== Fichte ===
Johann Gottlieb Fichte (1762–1814) was one of the founding figures of German idealism, which developed from the theoretical and ethical writings of Immanuel Kant. His philosophy forms a bridge between the ideas of Kant and those of the German idealist Georg Wilhelm Friedrich Hegel.

Fichte distinguished the finite or empirical ego from the pure or infinite ego. The activity of this "pure ego" can be discovered by a "higher intuition". (Note: See also Daniel Breazeale (2013), Thinking Through the Wissenschaftslehre: Themes from Fichte's Early Philosophy, and Stanford Encyclopedia of Philosophy, "Johann Gottlieb Fichte".)

According to Michael Whiteman, Fichte's philosophical system "is a remarkable western formulation of eastern mystical teachings (of which he seems to have had no direct knowledge)."

=== Schopenhauer ===
In 1812, Arthur Schopenhauer started to use the term "the better consciousness", a consciousness that "lies beyond all experience and thus all reason, both theoretical and practical (instinct)."

According to Yasuo Kamata, Schopenhauer's idea of "the better consciousness" finds its origin in Fichte's idea of a "higher consciousness" (höheres Bewusstsein) or "higher intuition", and also bears resemblance to Schelling's notion of "intellectual intuition". According to Schopenhauer himself, his notion of a "better consciousness" was different from Schelling's notion of "intellectual intuition", since Schelling's notion required intellectual development of the understanding, while his notion of a "better consciousness" was "like a flash of insight, with no connection to the understanding."

According to Schopenhauer,

The better consciousness in me lifts me into a world where there is no longer personality and causality or subject or object. My hope and my belief is that this better (supersensible and extra-temporal) consciousness will become my only one, and for that reason I hope that it is not God. But if anyone wants to use the expression God symbolically for the better consciousness itself or for much that we are able to separate or name, so let it be, yet not among philosophers I would have thought.

=== Main types ===
Different types of higher states of consciousness can arise individually or in various combinations. The list of known types of higher states of consciousness:

- modified states of consciousness, achieved with the help of meditative psychotechnics;
- optimal experience and the “flow” state;
- euphoria;
- lucid dreaming;
- out-of-body experience;
- near-death experience;
- mystical experience (sometimes regarded as the highest of all higher states of consciousness)

== Religion ==
=== Schleiermacher ===
Friedrich Schleiermacher (1768–1834) made a distinction between lower and higher self-consciousness. In Schleirmacher's theology, self-consciousness contains "a feeling that points to the presence of an absolute other, God, as actively independent of the self and its 'world'." For Schleiermacher, "all particular manifestations of piety share a common essence, the sense of dependency on God as the outside 'infinite'." The feeling of dependency, or "God-consciousness", is a higher form of consciousness. This consciousness is not "God himself", since God would then no longer be "an infinite infinite, but a finite infinite, a mere projection of consciousness."

For Schleiermacher, the lower self-consciousness is "the animal part of mankind", which includes basic sensations such as hunger, thirst, pain and pleasure, as well as basic drives and pleasures, and higher self-consciousness is, in the words of theologian Dawn DeVries, "the part of the human being that is capable of transcending animal instincts", and the "point of contact with God". Bunge describes this as "the essence of being human".

When this consciousness is present, "people are not alienated from God by their instincts". The relation between the lower and the higher consciousness is akin to "Paul's struggle of the spirit to overcome the flesh", or the distinction between the natural and the spiritual side of human beings.

=== 19th-century movements ===
The idea of a "wider self walled in by the habits of ego-consciousness" and the search for a "higher consciousness" was manifested in 19th century movements such as Theosophy, New Thought, Christian Science, and Transcendentalism.

The 19th-century Transcendentalists saw the entire physical world as a representation of a higher spiritual world. They believed that humans could elevate themselves above their animal instincts, attain a higher consciousness, and partake in this spiritual world.

Higher self is a term associated with multiple belief systems, but its basic premise describes an eternal, omniscient, conscious, and intelligent being, who is one's real self. Blavatsky, who founded the Theosophical Movement, formally defined the higher self as "Atma the inseparable ray of the Universe and one self. It is the God above, more than within, us". According to Blavatsky, each and every individual has a higher self. She wrote:

By that higher intuition acquired by Theosophia—or God-knowledge, which carried the mind from the world of form into that of formless spirit, man has been sometimes enabled in every age and every country to perceive things in the interior or invisible world.

Blavatsky refers to Fichte in her explanation of Theosophy:

Theosophy ... prompted such men as Hegel, Fichte and Spinoza to take up the labors of the old Grecian philosophers and speculate upon the One Substance—the Deity, the Divine All proceeding from the Divine Wisdom—incomprehensible, unknown and unnamed.

=== 20th-century movements ===
Aleister Crowley, founder of Thelema, referred to the higher consciousness or self as Harpocrates, which he identified as a name for the Holy Guardian Angel. In his early writings, Crowley states that the Holy Guardian Angel is the "silent self", the equivalent of the Genius of the Hermetic Order of the Golden Dawn, the Augoeides of Iamblichus, the Ātman of Hinduism, and the Daimon of the ancient Greeks.

Clairvoyant Edgar Cayce referred to higher consciousness as "the Christ pattern". This is not necessarily a tenet of Christianity, but the conviction that a regular person can be attuned to reach the same level of spirituality as did the historical Jesus.

=== Modern spirituality ===
The idea of "lower" and "higher" consciousness has gained popularity in modern popular spirituality. According to James Beverley, it lies at the heart of the New Age movement. Most New Age literature defines the Higher self as an extension of the self to a godlike state. This Higher Self is essentially an extension of the worldly self. With this perspective, New Age texts teach that the self creates its own reality when in union with the Higher Self.

Integral theorist Ken Wilber has tried to integrate eastern and western models of the mind, using the notion of "lower" and "higher" consciousness. In his book The Spectrum of Consciousness Wilber describes consciousness as a spectrum with ordinary awareness at one end, and more profound types of awareness at higher levels. In later works he describes the development of consciousness as a development from lower consciousness, through personal consciousness, to higher transpersonal consciousness.

== Cognitive science ==
Gerald Edelman distinguishes higher consciousness or "secondary consciousness" from "primary consciousness", defined as simple awareness that includes perception and emotion. Higher consciousness in contrast, "involves the ability to be conscious of being conscious", and "allows the recognition by a thinking subject of his or her own acts and affections". Higher consciousness requires, at a minimal level semantic ability, and "in its most developed form, requires linguistic ability, or the mastery of a whole system of symbols and a grammar".

== Psychotropics ==
Psychedelic drugs can be used to alter the brain cognition and perception, some believing this to be a state of higher consciousness and transcendence. Typical psychedelic drugs are hallucinogens including LSD, DMT, cannabis, peyote, and psilocybin mushrooms. According to Wolfson, these drug-induced altered states of consciousness may result in a more long-term and positive transformation of self.

According to Dutta, psychedelic drugs may be used for psychoanalytic therapy, as a means to gain access to the higher consciousness, thereby providing patients the ability to access memories that are held deep within their mind.

== See also ==
- Body of light – Hermetic starfire body
- Chakra – Subtle body centers in esoteric traditions
- Enlightenment – Highest spiritual goal in Buddhist cultivation
- Kether – First emanation in Kabbalah
- Monism – Philosophical view that everything in reality is ultimately one kind of thing
- Nondualism – Nonconceptual awareness and interconnectedness
- Open individualism – Theory of personal identity
- Psychological Types – 1921 book by Carl Gustav Jung
- Psychonautics – Research on altered states of consciousness
- Superconscious - a proposed aspect of mind to accompany the conscious and subconscious
- Sahasrara – 7th primary chakra in some yoga traditions
- True Will – Concept within the system of Thelema
- Vertiginous question – Philosophical question about personal identity
- Theosis
