= Activation–synthesis hypothesis =

Neurobiological theory

The activation–synthesis hypothesis, proposed by Harvard University psychiatrists John Allan Hobson and Robert McCarley, is a neurobiological theory of dreams first published in the American Journal of Psychiatry in December 1977. The differences in neuronal activity of the brainstem during waking and REM sleep were observed, and the hypothesis proposes that dreams result from brain activation during REM sleep. Since then, the hypothesis has undergone an evolution as technology and experimental equipment has become more precise. Currently, a three-dimensional model called AIM Model, described below, is used to determine the different states of the brain over the course of the day and night. The AIM Model introduces a new hypothesis that primary consciousness is an important building block on which secondary consciousness is constructed.

== Background ==
With the advancement of brain imaging technology, the sleep-waking cycle can be studied as never before. The brain can be objectively quantified and identified as being in either one of three states: awake, REM sleep, and NREM sleep due to these advanced methods of measurement. It has been shown that global deactivation of the brain from waking state to NREM sleep occurs, and a subsequent reactivation during REM sleep, to a degree greater than during waking. Consciousness and its substates, primary consciousness and secondary consciousness, play a part in identifying the state of the brain. Primary consciousness is the simple awareness of perception and emotion; that is, the awareness of the world via advanced visual and motor coordination information your brain receives. Secondary consciousness is an advanced state that includes both primary consciousness and abstract analysis, or thinking, and metacognitive components, or the awareness of being aware. Most animals show some stages of primary consciousness, but only humans have been experimentally shown to experience secondary consciousness. The cycle of waking-NREM-REM sleep is essential to mental health of mammals. It has been shown through experimentation that animals subjected to inability to enter REM sleep show an immediate attempt to quickly enter REM stages and long-term effects on motor coordination and habitual motor habits, eventually leading to the death of the animal. It has also been shown that homeothermic animals might require sleep to maintain body weight and temperature.

=== Waking ===
The waking consciousness is the awareness of the world, our bodies, and ourselves. This includes humans experiencing the awareness of being aware of ourselves, an intrinsic ability to humans. It's the ability to look in a mirror and know that you are looking at yourself, and not just another human being. Wakefulness allows the distinction between tasks and default brain states, and also distinguishes between background and foreground processing. Being awake allows the person to not only be aware of themselves and the world, but also to have conscious motor coordination and understand the difference between need and want that comes from secondary consciousness.

== Difference between sleep and dream ==
There is a difference between being just asleep and in a state of mind called dreaming. Sleeping can be described as the lack of conscious awareness of the outside world, meaning large portions of the brain that receive and interpret signals are deactivated during this time, while dreaming is a specific state of sleep in which enhanced brain activity has been shown to occur, theorizing the primary consciousness could be active during dreaming. Indeed, during dreams we are consciously aware of our surroundings, and assuredly have a certain perception and emotion throughout the course of the dream, suggesting that at least part of the primary consciousness is activated during the dream.

== Dream ==
A dream has all features of primary consciousness but is produced in the brain without external stimulation. Unlike the waking state, the brain cannot recognize its own condition; that it is in the midst of the dream and is not the same as the real world. The brain has a single-minded state of primary consciousness during dreaming, which allows the brain to reach greater perception and awareness of a single scenario out of images and dreams. This is called the dream consciousness.

=== Four stages of sleep ===
The four sleep stages have been identified as follows: sleep onset stage I, late-night stage II, and deep sleep stages III and IV. Deep sleep stages III and IV all occur during the first half of the night, while lighter stages I and II occur during the later half. During standard sleep laboratory measurements, the states of sleep and waking have behavioral, polygraphic, and psychological manifestation within the pontine brainstem. These states are regulated by a reciprocal relationship between two types of neuronal cells, aminergic inhibitory cells such as serotonin and norepinephrine and cholinergic excitatory cells such as acetylcholine. Changes in the sleep stages occur when the activity curves of these neurons cross. REM sleep stage I is a state of sleep just above and most closely linked to sleep onset stage I.

==== NREM ====
NREM sleep can be described as the stages of sleep that show greatly decreased brain activity. There are four different stages of NREM sleep. The brain shows dulled or limited senses of perception, though the thought process has been shown to be logical and perseverative. Episodic movements of the body occur during these stages, though they are involuntary movements.

=== REM ===
REM sleep may be a more evolutionarily recent sleep state, and is prominent in most birds and mammals, although may exist in reptiles and other vertebrates to varying degrees. REM stands for rapid eye movement. It is generally a later sleep state following non-REM (NREM) sleep. It is regulated in part by the pontine brainstem. Infants spend most of their time in REM sleep, and rather than enter stage 1 sleep they may go directly to REM sleep. Most REM sleep occurs just above stage I of sleep, and experiences different mental abilities than during NREM sleep. The thought process is sometimes non-logical or even bizarre, sensation and perception is vivid but created internally by the brain, and the body's movements are inhibited. Most REM stages last 10–15 minutes, and the average human will go through 4–6 of these stages during sleep each night. Subsequent REM stages increase in duration, so the last REM stage before awakening is the longest and thus may have the most vivid dream imagery. It has been proposed that REM sleep is necessary for preparation of many integrative functions, of which one is consciousness. It supports the idea that sleep, and dreaming, is necessary or at least optimal preparation for the next day's processes. The scientific tracking of REM sleep stages can be measured by neuronal signals within the pontine brainstem. The interactions of aminergic inhibitory neurons and cholinergic excitatory neurons can be measured, and REM sleep occurs when aminergic cells are at their least active and cholinergic cells are at their most active.

==== Evolution of REM ====
It has been stated that REM sleep is a recent evolutionary behavior in homeothermic animals. In both, there is increased REM sleep in the early stages of life. In humans, REM sleep peaks during the third trimester of gestation, and quickly falls after birth as primary consciousness declines and secondary consciousness grows with the development of the brain. The developing control over stages of sleep and waking suggests that sleep and REM has developed as a way to self-activate in order to anticipate awake-state circumstances.

=== Neuronic modeling ===
Within the pons, the modeling and tracking of these aminergic inhibitory neurons and cholinergic excitatory neurons occurs via the study of PGO waves. These are phasic waves that occur in cycles, and originate from the pontine brainstem (P), lateral geniculate of thalamus (G), and occipital cortex (O). Aminergic monoamines serotonin, noradrenaline, histamine, and dopamine are balanced between acetylcholine cholinergic signals, and play a part in the regulation of cognition. Aminergic cell signal strength is lowest during REM sleep, increases during NREM, and is highest at waking. Cholinergic cell signal strength is highest during REM, declines during NREM, and is lowest at waking. Changes in sleep state and phase occur when two activity paths cross.

== Theory ==
The development of consciousness is a gradual, time-consuming and lifelong process that builds upon and uses a more primitive virtual reality generator that is more definable in our dreams. As such, the development of secondary consciousness during the lifetime requires a blank consciousness that during REM sleep creates an imaginary self that has movements and experiences emotions. This is an experimental state not associated with awareness, and this state, or protoconscious, is able to be reached during childhood. This protoconsciousness is a protoself created early in life by the brain as a building block for consciousness to develop, and provides intrinsic predictions of external inputs created by dreaming.

=== Original activation–synthesis hypothesis model ===
Hobson and McCarley originally proposed in the 1970s that the differences in the waking-NREM-REM sleep cycle was the result of interactions between aminergic REM-off cells and cholinergic REM-on cells. This was perceived as the activation–synthesis model, stating that brain activation during REM sleep results in synthesis of dream creation. Hobson's five cardinal characteristics include: intense emotions, illogical content, apparent sensory impressions, uncritical acceptance of dream events, and difficulty in being remembered.

=== Current model – AIM ===
Thanks to the development of technology since the original proposal, new experimental data has been collected and additional mechanistic details of neuronal control have been developed. It has been determined that consciousness states can be described with three values, and the AIM model is a model that uses these values for representing the similarities and differences between waking and dreaming. It is a three-dimensional state-space model that describes different states of the brain and their variance throughout the day and night. It is composed of three different values: A – activation, I – input-output gating, and M – modulation. The model is limited however, in that it cannot yet explain the regional differences in brain activity that distinguish REM sleep from waking. Other limitations include the inability to quantifiably identify and measure M in humans. During waking and activation of primary and secondary consciousnesses, high values of A, I, and M have been observed, but during REM sleep high values of A but low I and M have been observed.

==== Protoconsciousness ====
The protoconsciousness is template of consciousness that occurs during sleep, and on which can be constructed other mental conscious processes. Early in childhood, it has been said that this protoconsciousness is where secondary aspects of consciousness are originally developed and tested by the primary consciousness, and the person can slowly develop increased secondary consciousness throughout their life as their protoconscious template is further expanded, developed, and creates more vivid ideas and representations of secondary consciousness.

==== Activation (A) ====
Large parts of the brain that are activated and sending signals during waking are inactive during NREM sleep and become reactivated during REM sleep. It is based on the fact that the brain and its neural circuitry is plastic and self-regulating, especially in its own activation and inactivation. This was observed by two experiments: development of sleepiness after dopamine neuron destruction in substantia nigra in the midbrain, and discovery of the reticular activating system, which are visual cues received through our eyes and to our brain that begin the waking process, that waking consciousness depends sleep. Following these studies, it became clear that activity levels and quality of consciousness were functions of brain activation and deactivation.

==== Input-output gating (I) ====
It has been shown that the internal activation of the brain is associated with the inhibition of both external sensory input and motor output. This implies that the brain is actively kept offline during REM, and the brainstem guarantees the coordination of factors I and A via the input-output gate control within the brainstem. PGO waves play a part in the ability of the brain to remain asleep while constituting the building blocks for perception and fine motor control via their phasic coordination. It has therefore been proposed that PGO signals are used in the construction of visual imagery of dreams.

==== Modulation (M) ====
The neuromodulator release of aminergic neurons have a broad chemical influence on the brain; they instruct other neurons to keep or discard a record of information they've processed. The mechanics of modulation are not known at this time, and modulation has yet to be quantitatively identified. Qualitatively, aminergic modulation has been shown to be strong during waking but lower during sleep, but more studies need to be conducted. Numerous studies have emerged from the discipline of computational neuroscience that support to the AIM model. The theory of Metalearning in particular describes how these neuromodulators facilitate dynamic learning, though a series of interpretive models all consistent with the AIM model.

== Implications ==
The three-dimensional AIM model shows that during the cycle of brain states waking-NREM-REM, the brain is dynamically changing constantly, and that this state space described by the AIM has an infinite number of subregions other than the main three. It proposes that via a protoconsciousness brain activation during sleep is necessary for the development and maintenance of waking consciousness and other higher-order brain functions such as problem solving. It suggests the possibility that the state of waking consciousness is only present in humans due to the evolution of extensive cortical structures within the brain. Dreaming is a state of the brain that is similar to yet different from the waking consciousness, and interaction and correlation between the two is necessary for optimal performance from both. One study conducted measuring brain activity via EEG used Hobson's AIM model to show that quantitatively dream consciousness is remarkably similar to waking consciousness.
