= Superconscious =

Proposed aspect of mind where knowledge is acquired through psychic or nonphysical means

The superconscious (also super-conscious or super conscious) is a proposed aspect of mind to accompany the conscious and subconscious and/or unconscious. According to its proponents, the superconscious is able to acquire knowledge through non-physical or psychic mechanisms and pass that knowledge to the conscious mind. It therefore is purported to transcend ordinary consciousness. The term is also used to describe transcendental states of consciousness achieved through meditation and related practices, thus accessing the superconscious mind directly.

According to this model, knowledge acquired by the superconscious need not be from the present or nearby. It may be from the past or future, from a physically remote present, or of beings undetectable by the physical senses. Superconsciousness is therefore believed by its supporters to provide an explanation for psychic phenomena such as precognition, remote vision and seances.

Mainstream science does not recognise such psychic phenomena as genuine, and therefore regards theories to account for them as pseudoscience.

== History ==
An early exponent of the superconscious was William Walker Atkinson, an American occultist and prolific author of the late 19th and early 20th centuries. The idea was expanded on by British novelist, playwright, World War I-era activist and spiritualist Edith Lyttelton.

More recently, Popov et al. suggested that the superconscious is the source of creative and intuitive thought as well as spirituality, and that it arises from holistic brain activity, processing much more information than the conscious mind.

Manuel Sans Segarra also talks about the superconcious as "a form of consciousness that goes further than the body and mind and it can exist in a state of superposition and interlink with other forms of consciousness in the universe".

== See also ==
- Akashic Records
- Collective unconscious
- Clairvoyance
- Higher consciousness
