= Robert McCarley =

American psychiatrist and academic

Robert W. McCarley
- Born: 1937; Mayfield, Kentucky, United States
- Died: May 27, 2017 (aged 79–80)
- Education: Harvard College, Harvard Medical School
- Known for: Activation-synthesis hypothesis
- Scientific career
- Fields: Psychiatry and dream research

Robert W. McCarley, MD, (1937–2017) was chair and Professor of Psychiatry at Harvard Medical School and the VA Boston Healthcare System. He was also Director of the Laboratory of Neuroscience located at the Brockton VA Medical Center and the McLean Hospital. McCarley was a prominent researcher in the field of sleep and dreaming as well as schizophrenia.

McCarley graduated from Harvard College in 1959 and Harvard Medical School in 1964. During his residency at Massachusetts Mental Health Center, he studied with J. Allan Hobson. In 1977, Hobson and McCarley developed the activation synthesis theory of dreaming that said that dreams do not have meanings and are the result of the brain attempting to make sense of random neuronal firing in the cortex. McCarley has extensively studied the brainstem mechanisms that control REM sleep. Additionally, he has studied the buildup of adenosine in the basal forebrain following sleep deprivation.

In the area of schizophrenia, McCarley studied brain abnormalities in patients with schizophrenia. McCarley and Martha Shenton published a classic paper in 1992 that described a relationship in a reduction in the volume of the left superior temporal gyrus and thought disorder in patients with schizophrenia.

McCarley has been presented with many awards for his research. In 1998, he received William S. Middleton Award which is the highest honor awarded to a VA biomedical research scientist. He has also been presented awards from the Sleep Research Society, American Psychiatric Association, and American Academy of Sleep Medicine.

In 2007, McCarley was ranked as the ninth most cited author in the field of schizophrenia research over the past decade. McCarley has published around 300 research articles and several books and book chapters such as Brain Control of Wakefulness and Sleep.
