= Dream consciousness =

Dream consciousness is a term defined by the theorist of dreaming science J. Allan Hobson, M.D. as the memory of subjective awareness during sleep.

According to the theory its importance for cognitive science derives from two perspectives. One is the brain basis for consciousness itself and the other is the interpretation of dreams. Knowing the brain basis of consciousness reduces the Hard problem of consciousness in a significant way while the provision of an alternative to psychodynamic dream interpretation frees that subject from the controversy in which it has been immersed for more than a century. These twin advances in the science of dreaming are elaborated in Hobson's books and articles. The following is a synopsis of the main points on dream consciousness as explained in his works.

== The hard problem ==
The “Hard problem” is defined as the difficulty in specifying how subjective awareness could arise from brain activity. Dream consciousness occurs when the brain is activated during sleep; during REM sleep, that activation is as intense as it is in waking. At the same time, the input-output gates of the brain are actively closed and the chemical balance is shifted from aminergic to cholinergic. The result is an activated, offline, cholinergic brain which, per force rather than perchance, dreams. Waking and dreaming are thus two conscious states whose similarities and differences are now understood.

While acknowledging that this still does not resolve the “hard problem” (of consciousness), in that it fails to specify exactly how and why the activated waking and REM sleeping brain becomes conscious, Hobson suggests that one answer is that the “hard problem” is ill-posed in that it makes a dualistic distinction between brain and mind. An alternative theory is that brain and mind are two physical aspects of a unified system, the brain-mind. His discussion of these philosophical issues is summarized in further detail below.

According to Hobson, dream interpretation has, until recently, relied on theories of symbolic transformations of mental content and the formal approach described here does not disprove previous schemata. It does, however, supply a more neutral cognitive alternative or constitute a new solution to an age-old problem. In Hobson's view, the content of dream consciousness is the integration of recent experience with prior information. That prior information consists of sensorimotor, emotional, and motivational components — many of which can be specified and measured. In keeping with the view that the offline brain is activated in REM sleep, dreaming may be seen as the brain's effort to reformulate its model of the world so as to be a more effective predictor of its future experience.

== Philosophical considerations ==
Hobson & Friston (2014) write that the “hard problem” can be seen as a residue of Cartesian dualism, which considers brain and mind to be qualitatively distinct entities. As such it is indeed “hard”, if not impossible, to explain how consciousness could arise from brains. Yet there is no similar difficulty seen in the literature when it comes to integrating consciousness components such as perception, memory and emotion. Hence, Hobson argues, consciousness may thus be no more and no less than the simultaneous combination of all of these components. (Hobson, 2013).

The key move in accepting and advancing this idea is to specify dual aspect monism as the concept best adapted to a new view of the brain-mind has a unified system with two components, one objective (the brain) and one subjective (the mind).

Hobson's theory of the brain in waking, sleeping, and dreaming contends that both the brain and the mind are physical and therefore subject to the same basic rules and regulations as other materials. Being physical, they are necessarily causal one upon the other and the other upon the one. Thus the states of the brain entail the states of the mind and vice versa. While we can imagine (and observe) states of the brain that are not associated with states of the mind, it is not possible to imagine or observe states of the mind that are not associated with states of the brain. For this reason, Hobson argues that a high priority should be accorded to brain science supposing that it will help better understand the mind. This is the principle on which Hobson's brain theory of consciousness and formal approach to dream interpretation is based.
