= Dream amelioration =

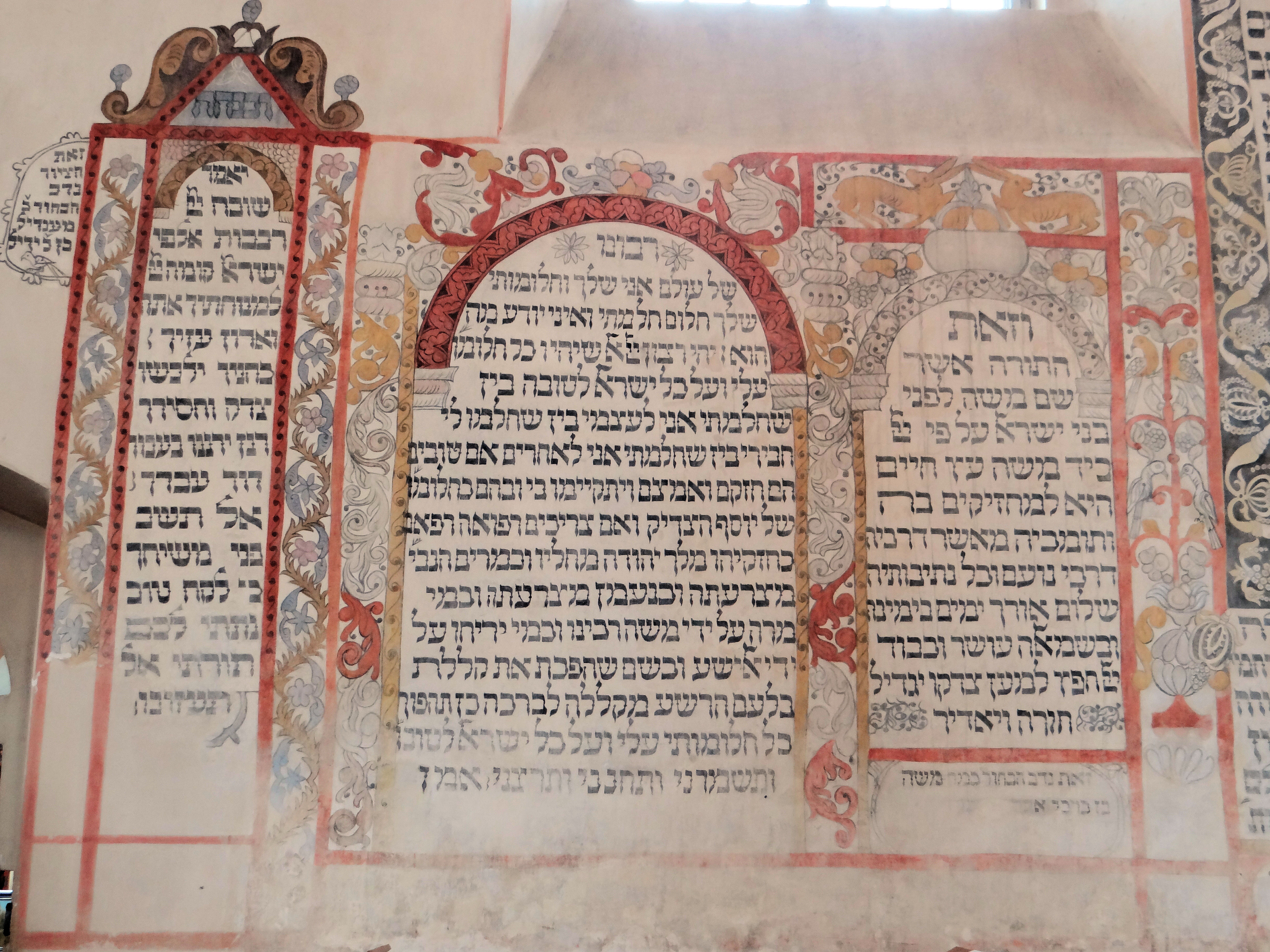
One of several copies of the prayer painted on walls at the Great Synagogue of Tykocin.

Dream amelioration (Hebrew: הטבת חלום, romanized: hatavat chalom, lit. 'improving a dream') is a ceremony mentioned in the Talmud to be performed by a person who has a troubling or distressing dream. The purpose of the ceremony is to prevent the dream coming to fruition or having an influence. The essence of the ceremony is asking three people to state that the dream is a good dream.

The Talmud also mentions other actions for a person who had a bad dream. One option is to recite the prayer for a bad dream, which should be said when the Cohanim recite the Priestly Blessing. Another option is a Ta'anit (fast) for a bad dream. According to the Talmud, "A fast for a bad dream is as effective as fire to kindling."

== Source of the custom ==
The concept of dream amelioration is mentioned in the Talmud Berachot:

Rav Hunda bar Ami said that Rabbi Pedat said that Rabbi Yohanan said: One who sees a dream and his soul is troubled by it, should improve it before three people. Let him bring three people and say to them 'I saw a good dream.' And let them say to him, 'It is good and let it be good. May the Merciful One make it good. May they decree for you from Heaven that it will be good and may it be good.' Then they should say three verses of opposites, three verses of redemption and three verses of peace.

== Ceremony of dream amelioration ==
The purpose of dream amelioration is that a person had a bad dream and wants to transform the message and essence of the dream into something good. To do this, one must tell three of one's friends or acquaintances who want good for the person so that they can have intent to transform it into a good dream.

The person who had the dream recites three times, "I had a good dream" (in Aramaic: "Chalma tava chazai"). They respond three times with the words, "It was good and it will be good" ("Tava hu, vetava lehavi"). They add afterwards that, "The Merciful One transforms for the best seven times. They decree on the dream from Heaven that it should be good and it will be good. Some hold that they say this seven times. Others hold that the words "The Merciful One transforms for the best seven times" are part of the rite, and they should say that three times.

Some have the custom to say three verses which include transformation, three verses of redemption and three other verses that speak of peace.

Afterwards, they should say:

Go eat your bread in happiness and drink your wine with a good heart, for the lord has already found favor in your deeds. And repentance, prayer and charity remove the evil decree. May there be peace to us and peace for all Israel, Amen. Siman tov and mazel tov for us and for all Israel, Amen.

== For someone who does not remember their dream ==
An alternative to the full dream amelioration, particularly if someone had a dream but does not remember it, is to recite a paragraph while the priests give the priestly blessing. This is printed in many siddurim. In places where the priests do not recite the blessing, it should be said during the repetition of the Amida, when the shaliach tzibbur says the priestly blessing.

== Laws of dream amelioration ==
- It is permitted to perform dream amelioration even on Shabbat, though some disagree.
- The Mishnah Berurah rules that one should perform dream amelioration first thing in the morning, based on the principle that "zealous people hasten to perform a mitzvah."
- It is permitted to perform dream amelioration even with three relatives, for example his children or siblings.
- A person who fasts over a bad dream should also perform dream amelioration.
