= Manuel Sans Segarra =

Spanish physician and surgeon

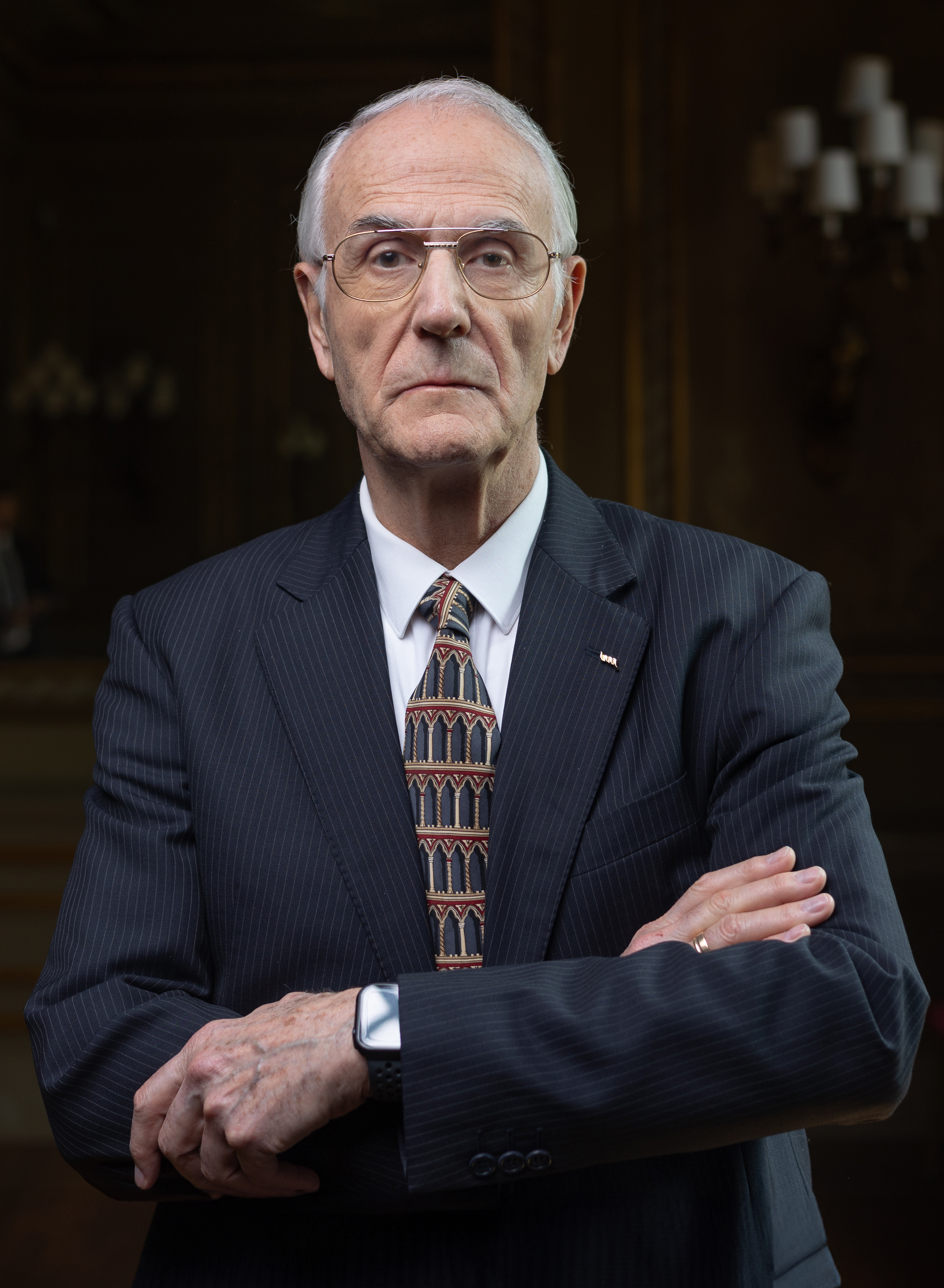
- Born: April 25, 1943 (age 82)
- Occupations: Physician; surgeon

Manuel Sans Segarra (born 25 April 1943) is a Spanish physician and surgeon who served as Head of Digestive Surgery at Bellvitge University Hospital in Barcelona.

== Medical and academic career ==
Sans Segarra studied medicine and surgery at the University of Barcelona. He completed a doctoral thesis on esophageal cancer, which was awarded cum laude.

He later served as Head of Digestive Surgery at Bellvitge University Hospital. He also held academic appointments as an Associate Professor of General and Digestive Surgery at the University of Barcelona.

In 2014, he received the Professional Excellence Award from the Official College of Physicians of Barcelona.

In May 2025, he was admitted as a Numerary Member of the Royal European Academy of Doctors.

== Public activities ==
A 2024 profile published by El Mundo described Sans Segarra in connection with public talks addressing death and immortality. He has also discussed near-death experiences and consciousness in an interview broadcast by RTVE (RNE).

== Research interests ==
According to interviews in Spanish media, Sans Segarra has focused part of his later public work on near-death experiences (NDEs). In these interviews, he has described his interest as emerging from clinical cases involving patients who were resuscitated after cardiac arrest.

In public discussions, he has been associated with views describing a form of consciousness that is not limited to brain activity, which he refers to as “supraconsciousness”.

== Criticism ==
Some authors have cited Sans Segarra in broader critiques of the use of concepts from quantum mechanics in non-physical contexts. These critiques describe such approaches as examples of quantum mysticism and question their scientific basis.

== Selected works ==
- La acigografía en el cáncer de esófago (doctoral thesis, 1976).
- La Supraconciencia Existe: Vida después de la vida. Planeta, 2024. ISBN 978-84-08-29128-2.
- Ego y Supraconsciencia: Buscando el sentido de la vida. Planeta, 2025. ISBN 978-84-08-30740-2.
