= Tykocin Synagogue =

Former synagogue in Tykocin, Poland

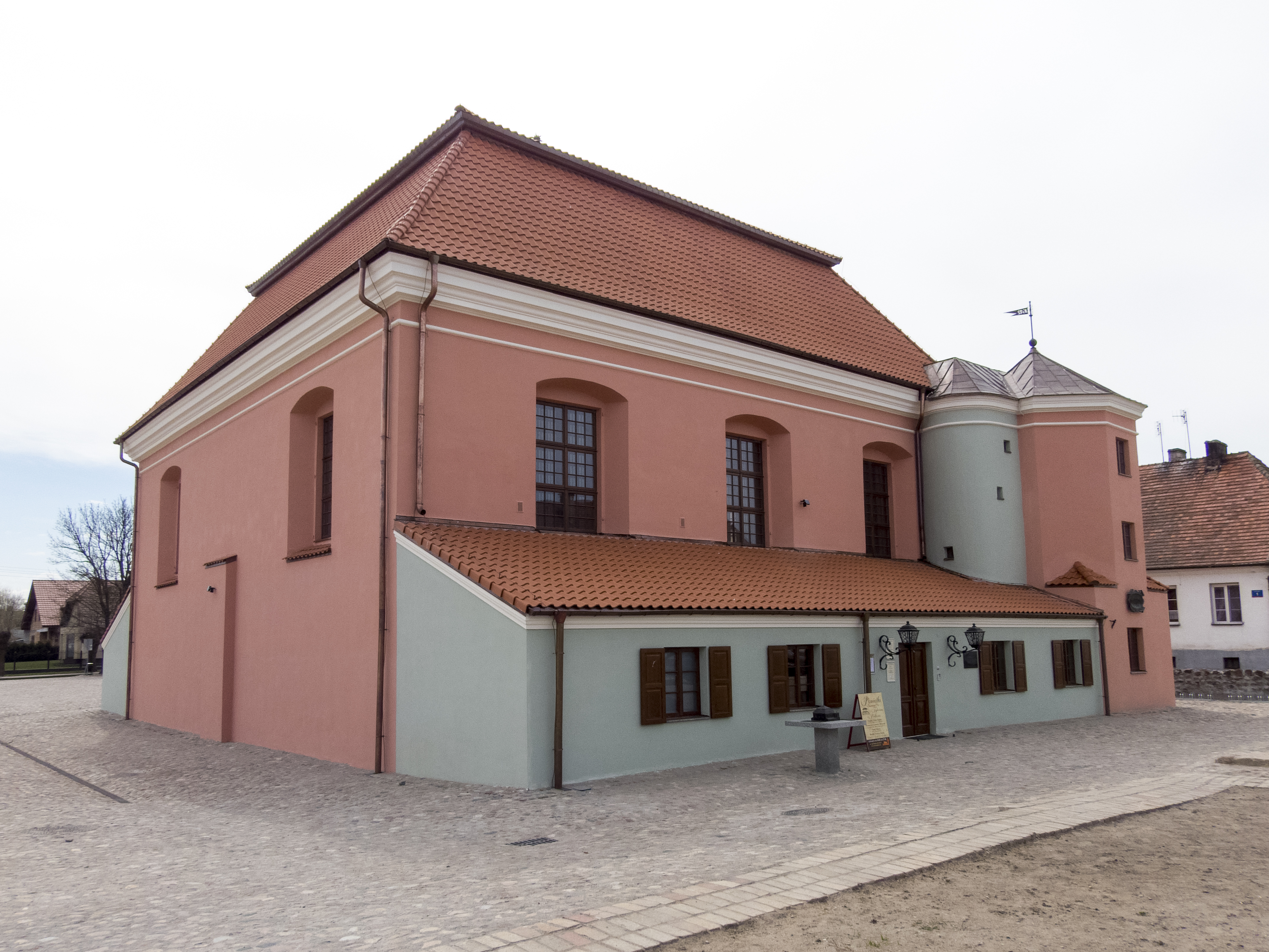
- The former synagogue, now museum, in 2019

- Location of the former synagogue, now museum, in Podlaskie Voivodeship

Religion
- Affiliation: Judaism (former)
- Rite: Nusach Ashkenaz
- Ecclesiastical or organizational status: Synagogue (1642–1939); Profane use (1939–1960s); Jewish museum (since late 1970s)
- Status: Abandoned (as a synagogue); Repurposed

Location
- Location: 2 Kozia Street, Tykocin, Podlaskie Voivodeship
- Country: Poland
- Interactive map of Tykocin Synagogue
- Coordinates: 53°12′24″N 22°46′02″E

Architecture
- Type: Synagogue architecture
- Style: Baroque; Mannerist
- Completed: 1642
- Materials: Brick

The Tykocin Synagogue is an historic former Jewish synagogue building, located in Tykocin, Podlaskie Voivodeship, Poland. The synagogue was completed in 1643, in the Mannerist-early Baroque style.

Disused as a synagogue during World War II, the building was used for profane purposes, restored during the 1970s, and repurposed as a Jewish museum.

== History ==
During the Nazi occupation of Poland in 1941, the synagogue was desecrated and then set up as a warehouse. After the end of the war, it remained in use as a warehouse for fertilizers. In 1965, a fire damaged the interiors.

The synagogue was thoroughly restored in the late 1970s. The historic wall paintings, most of which are decorative texts of Hebrew prayers, were restored. The elaborate, decorative ceiling was not reconstructed although some idea of the style can be gleaned from the design of the Torah Ark.

A former Beit Medrash (study and prayer hall) located across the street has been restored and is in use as a city museum.

Although no Jews now live in Tykocin, 40,000 tourists a year come to see the old synagogue, which remains "in lonely and unexpected splendor". The tourism has generated economic activity, including a cafe serving "Jewish-style" food and a bed-and-breakfast.

== Gallery ==
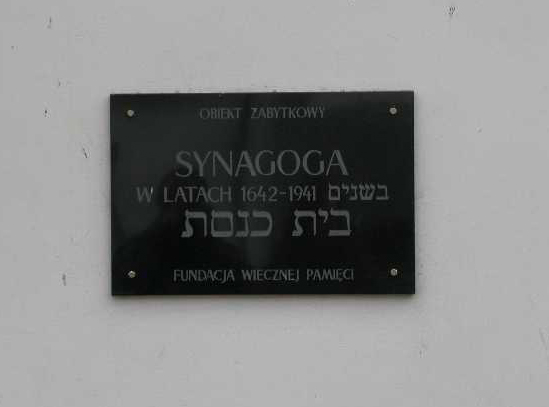

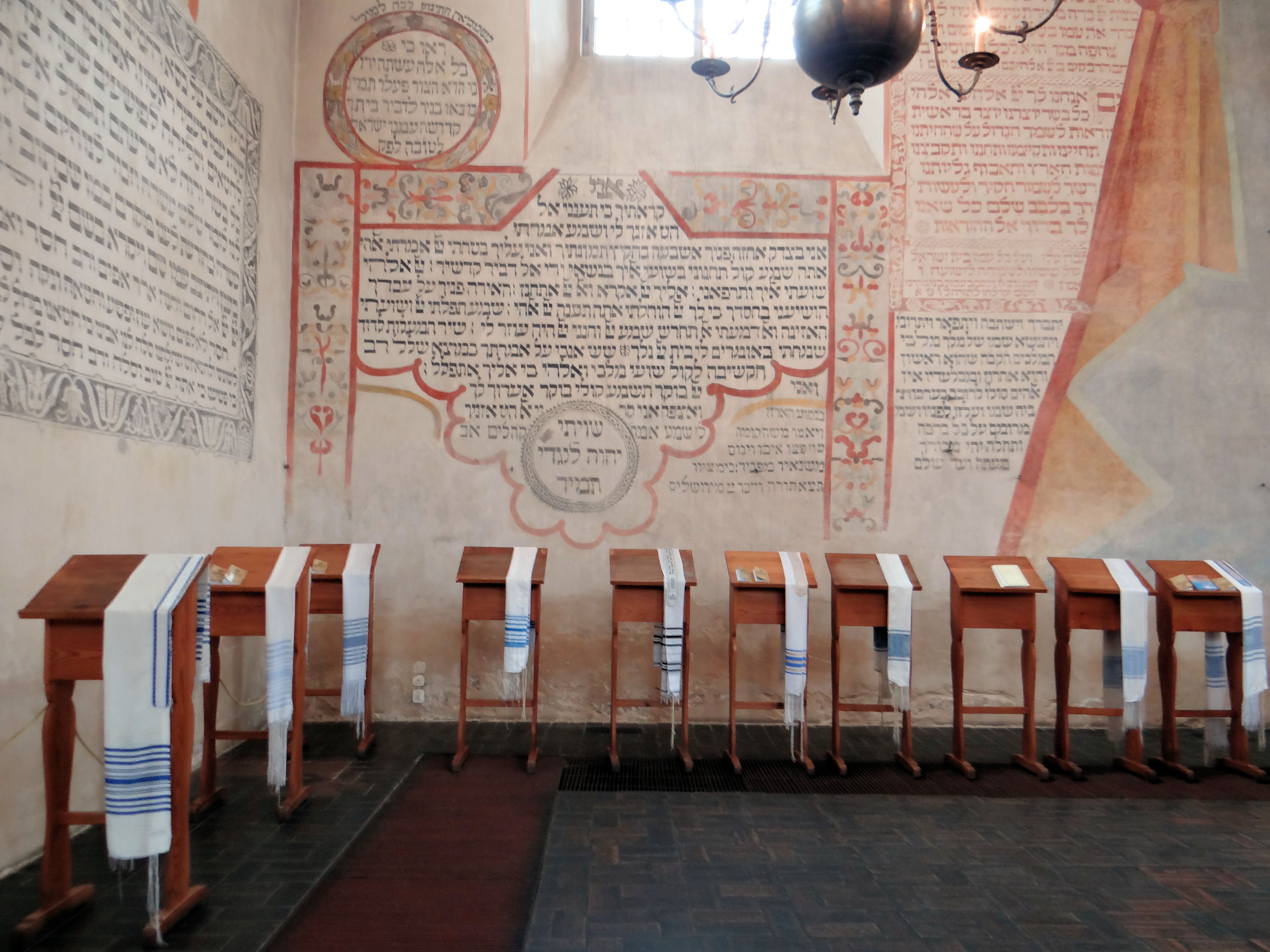

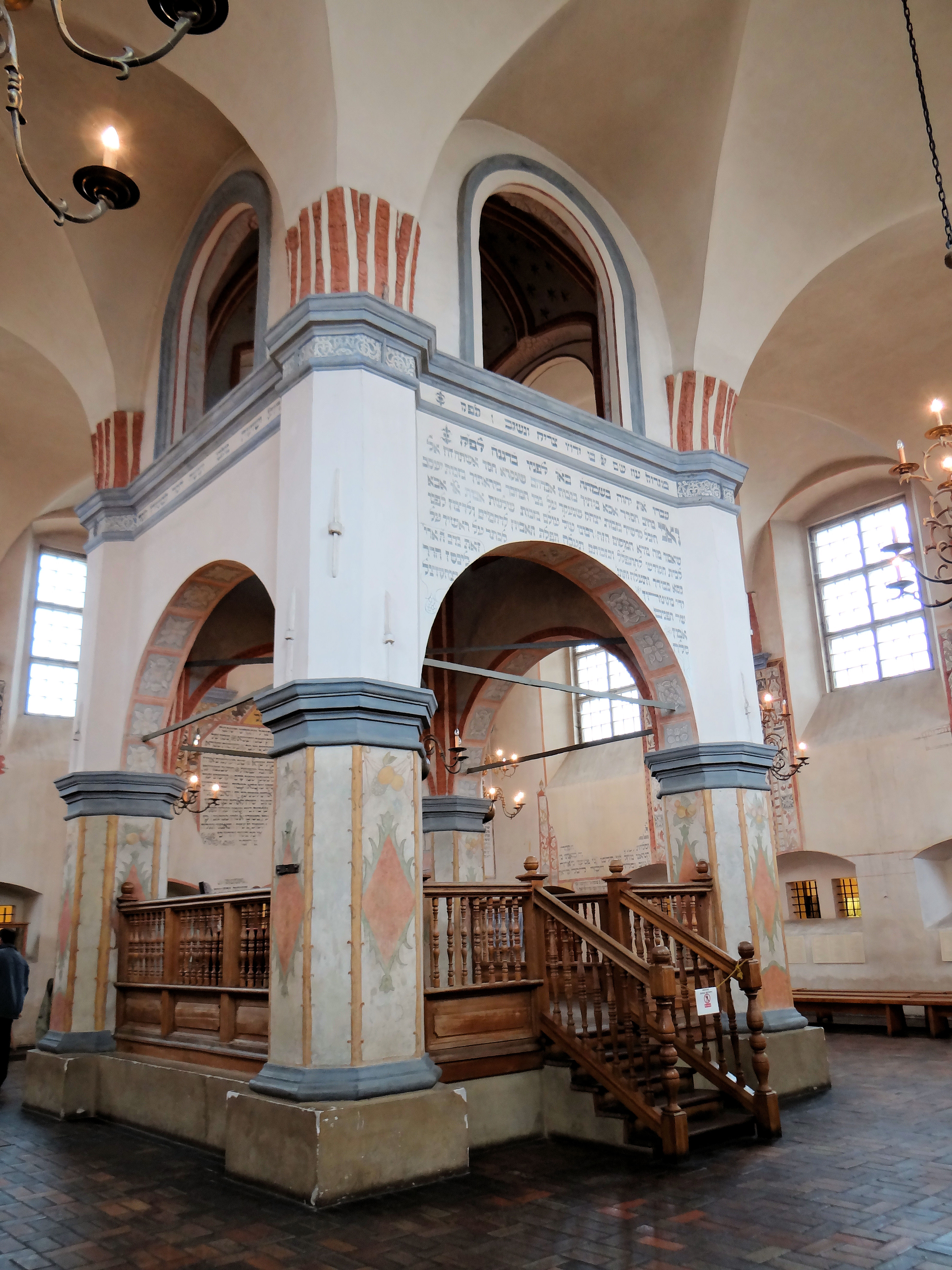
Bimah

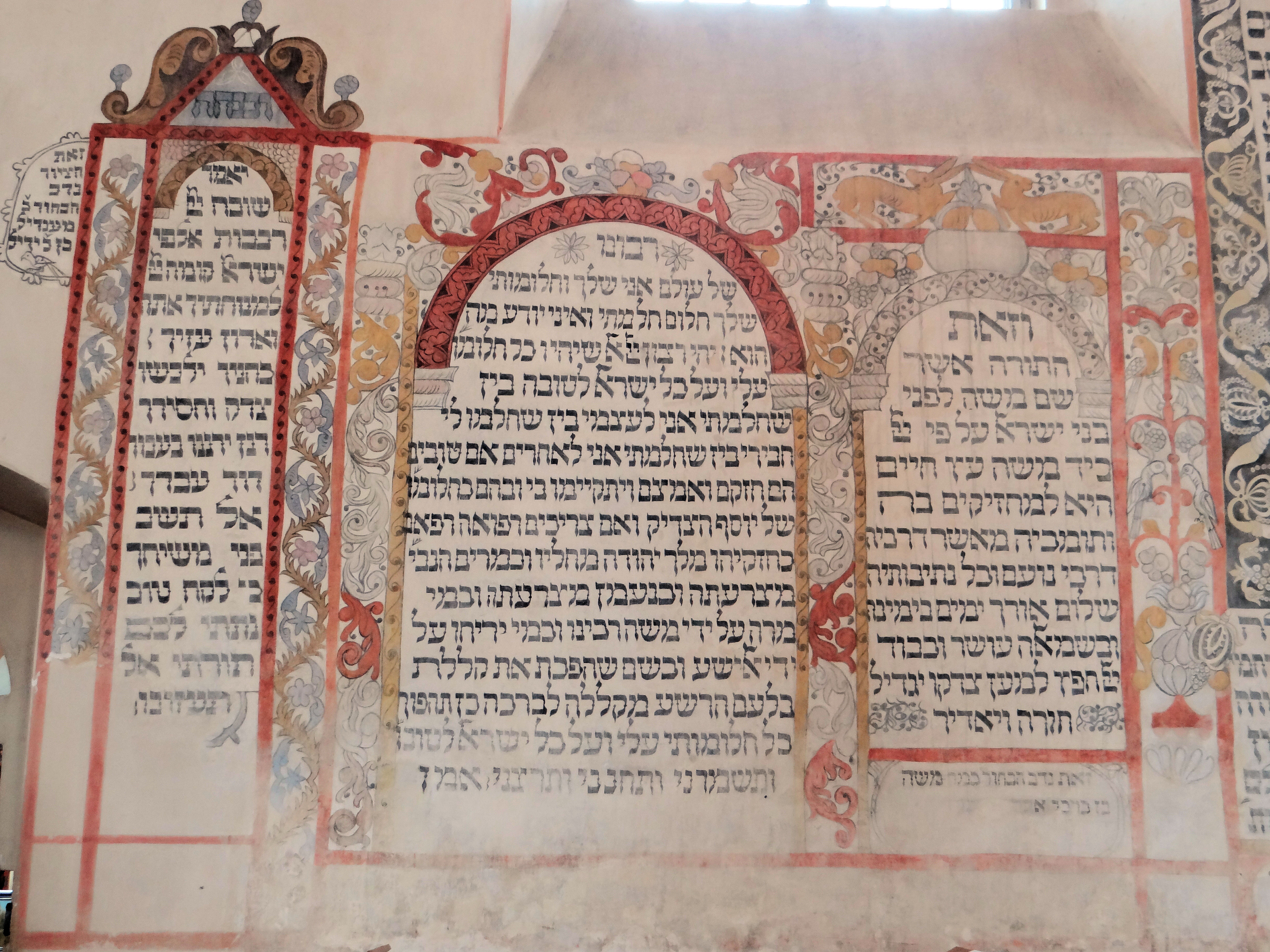

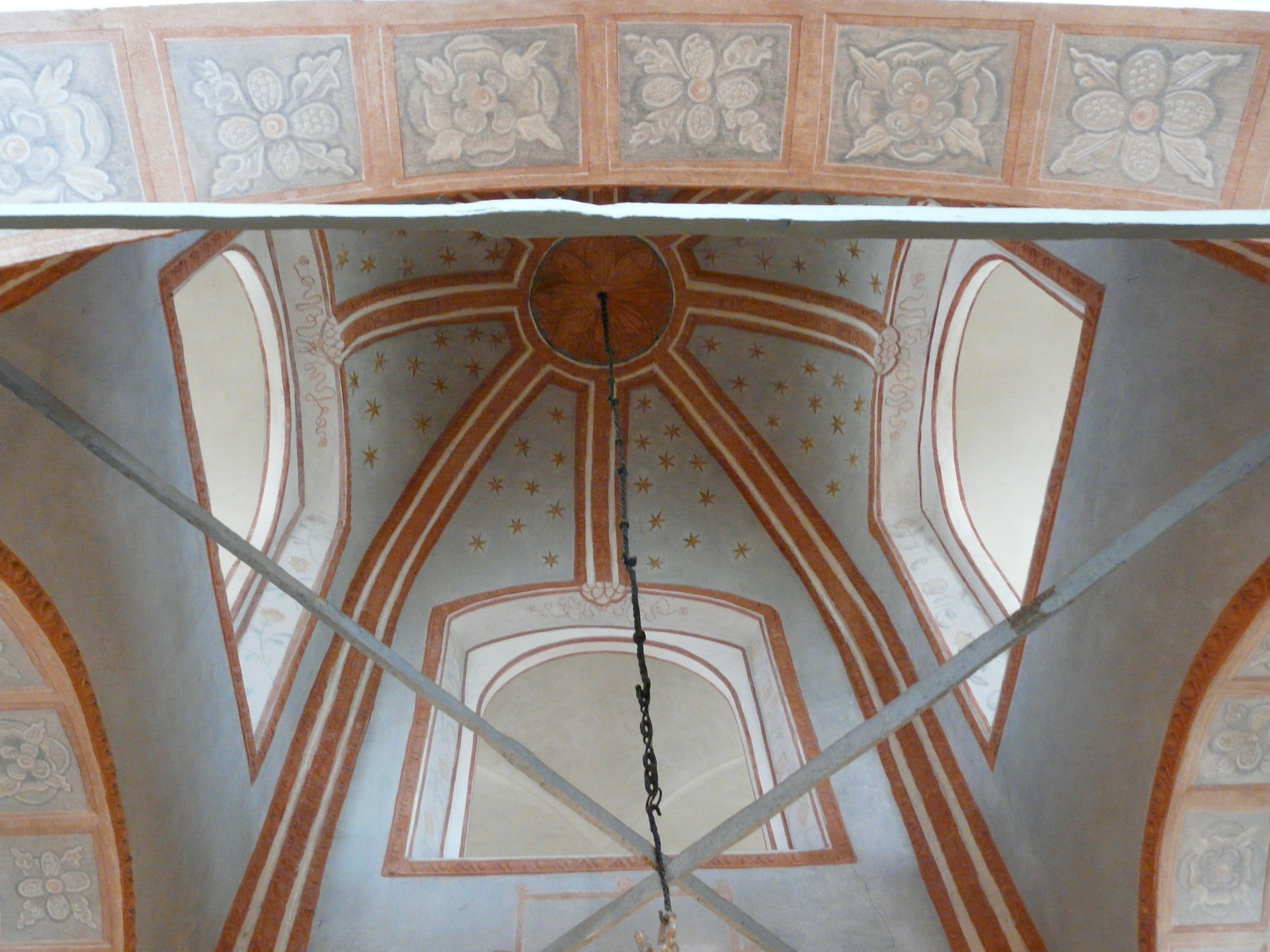
Ceiling

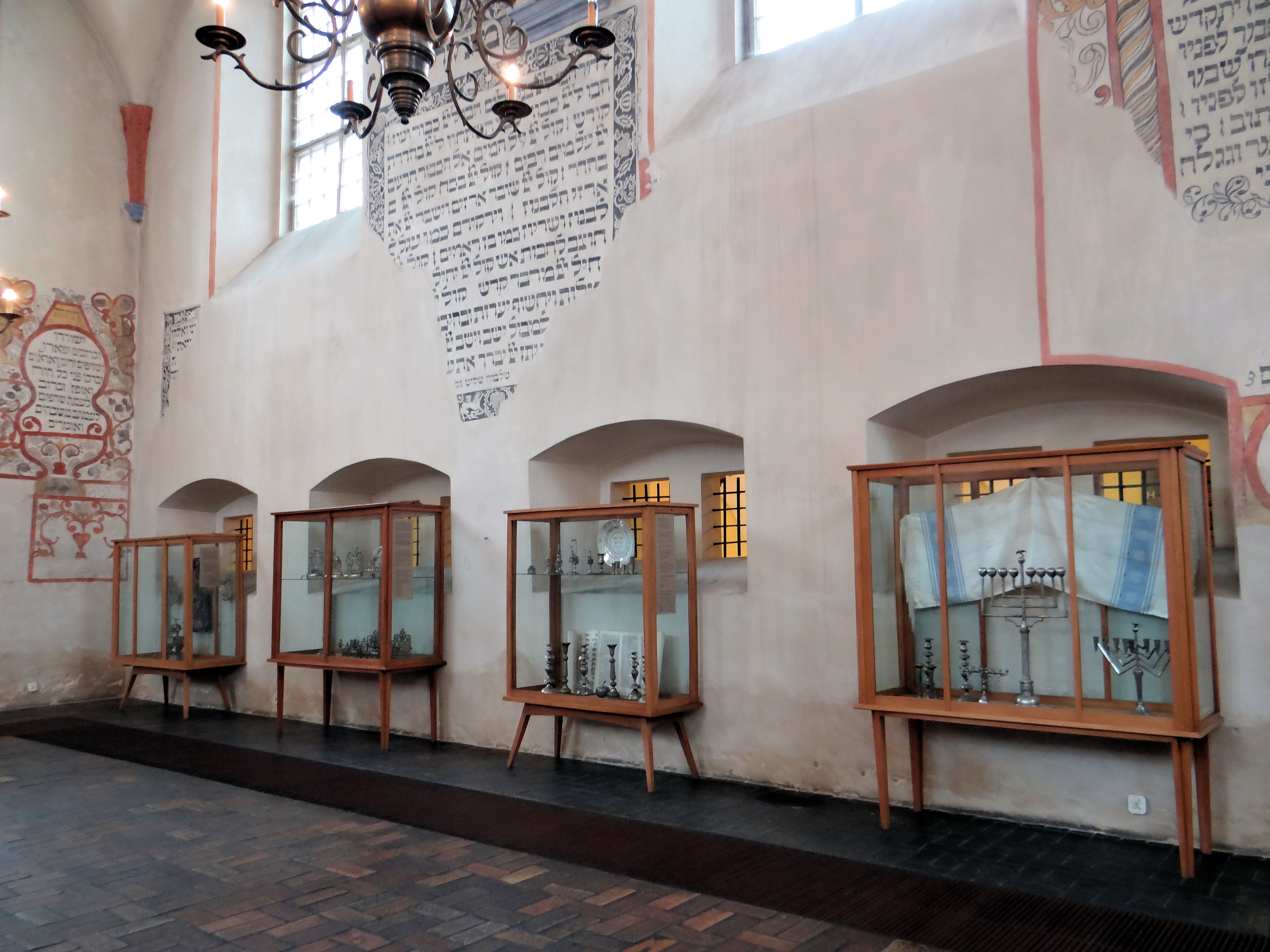

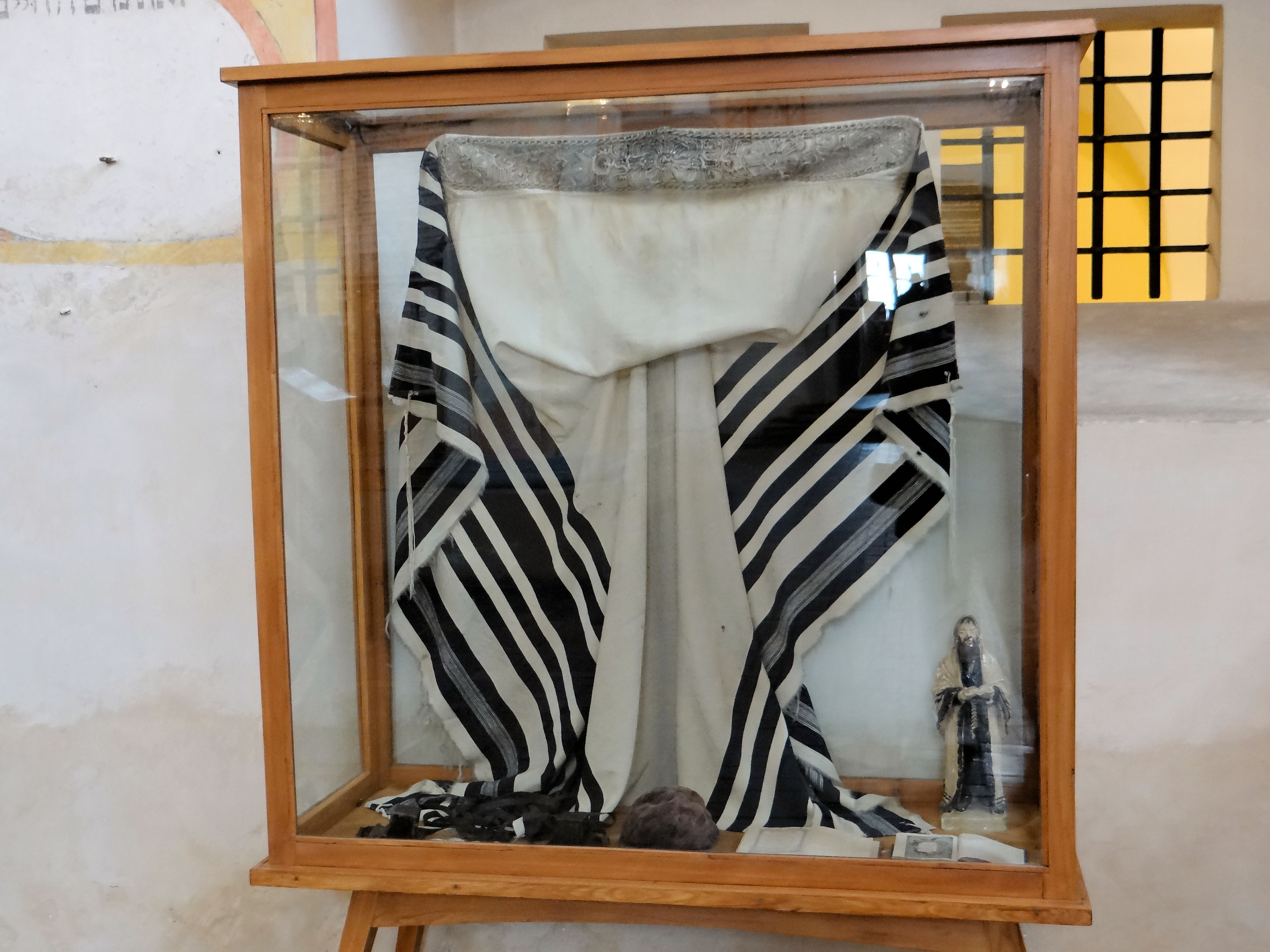
Tallit

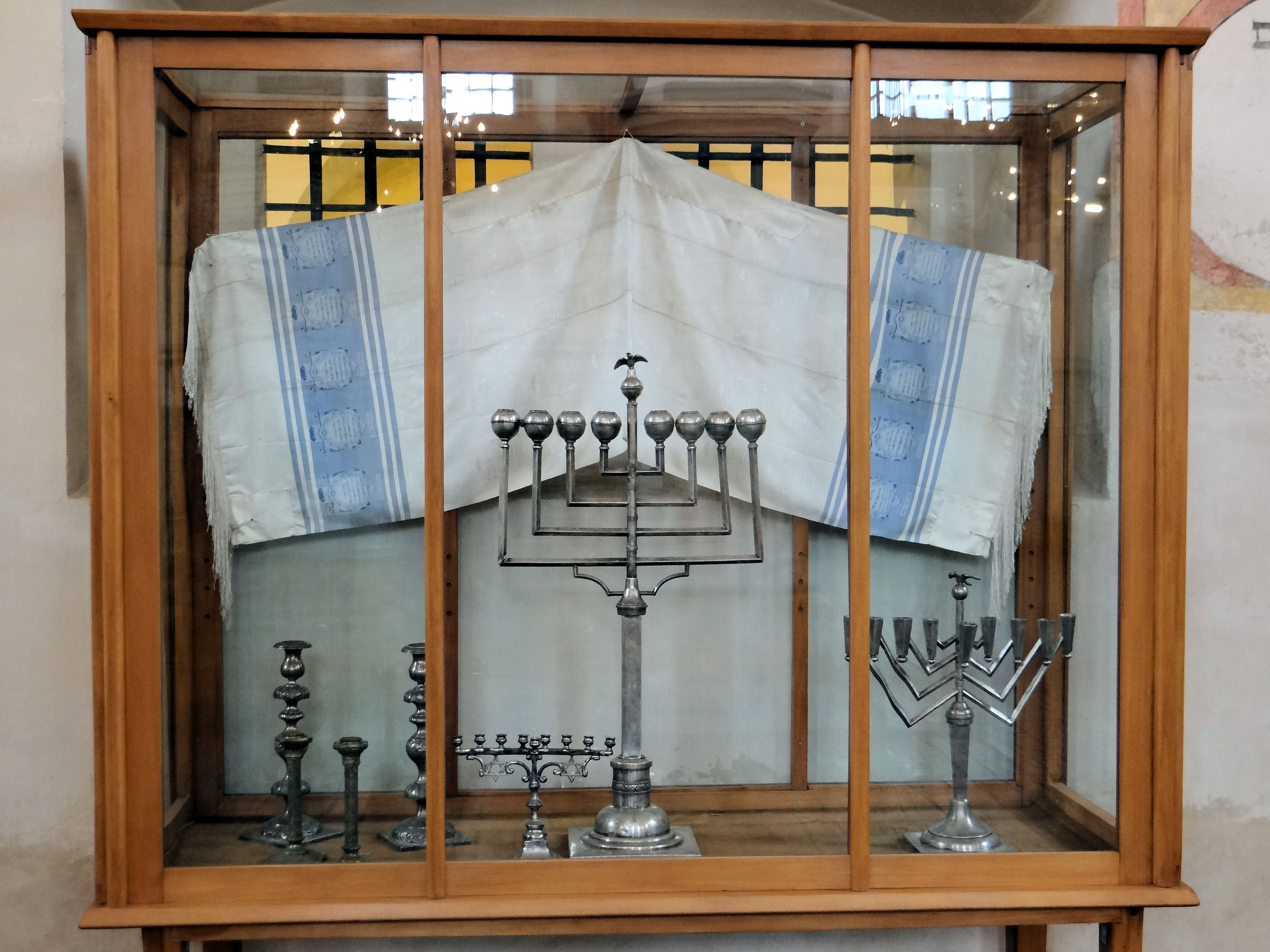
Tallit and Hanukiah

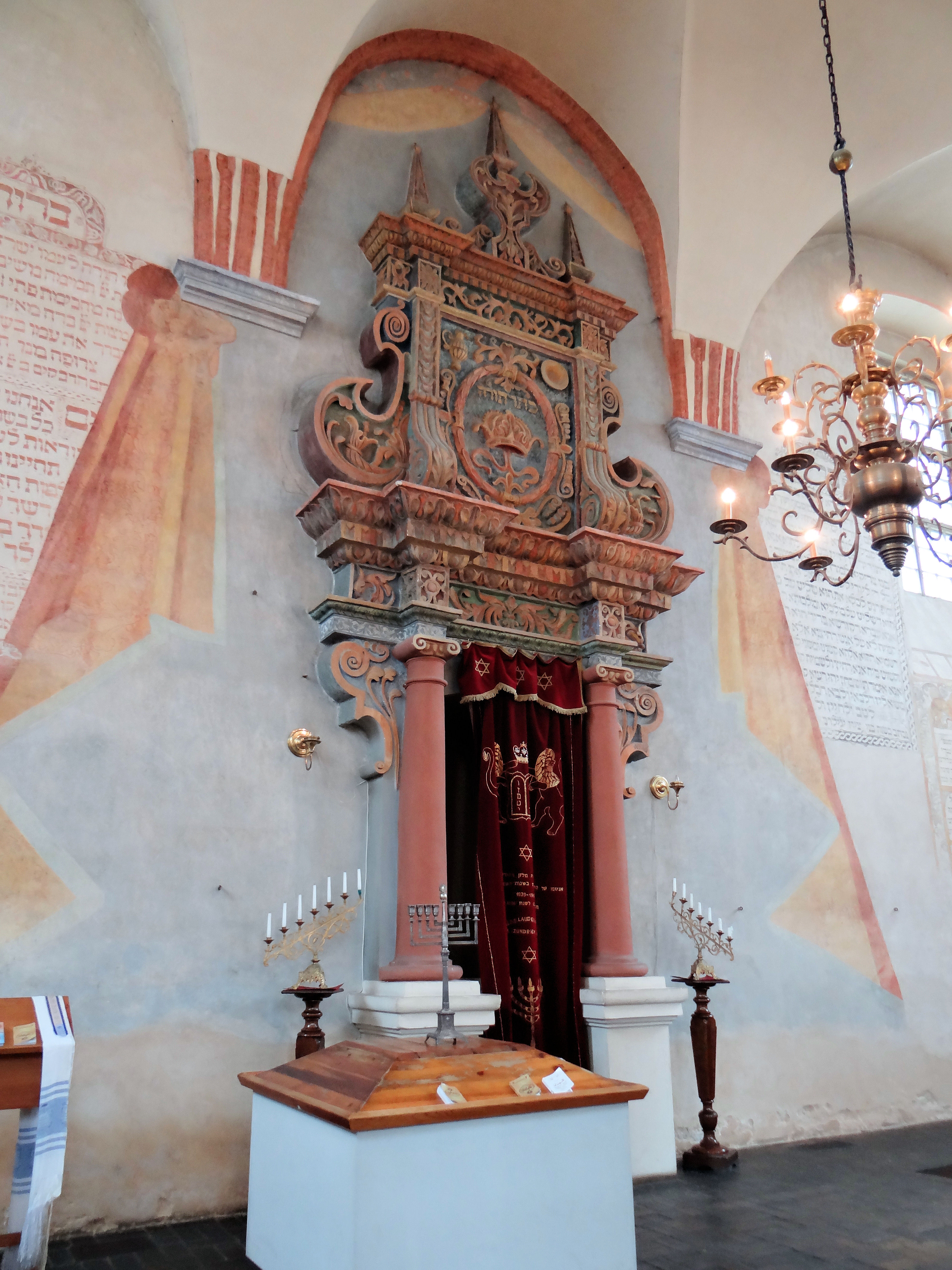
Torah ark

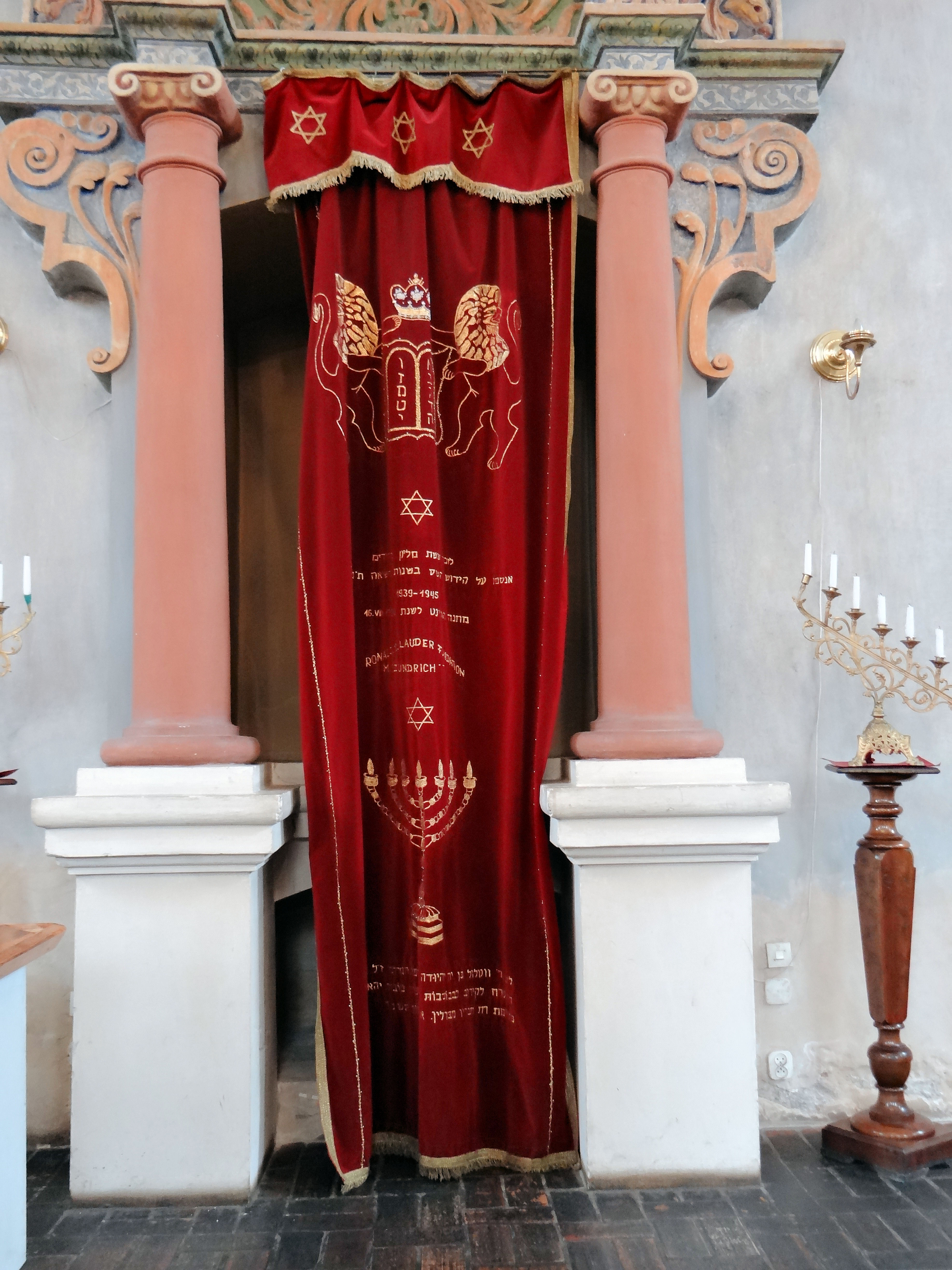
Torah ark closeup

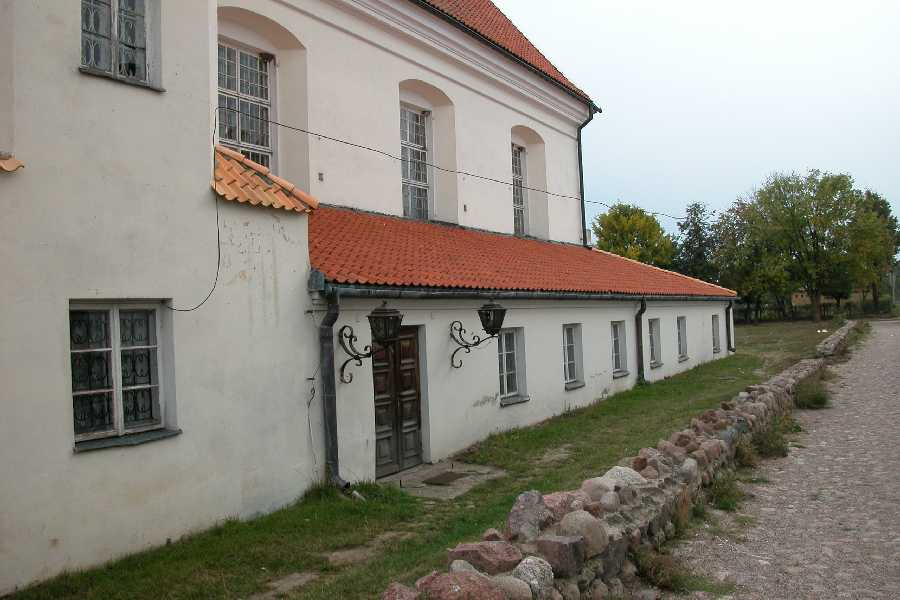

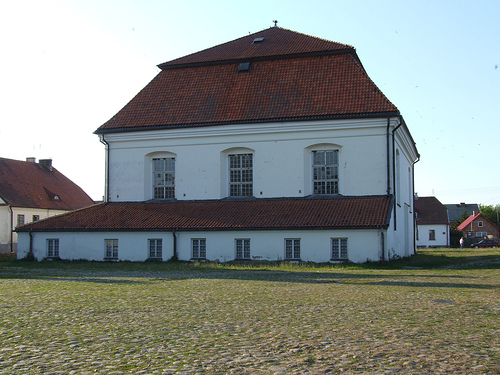

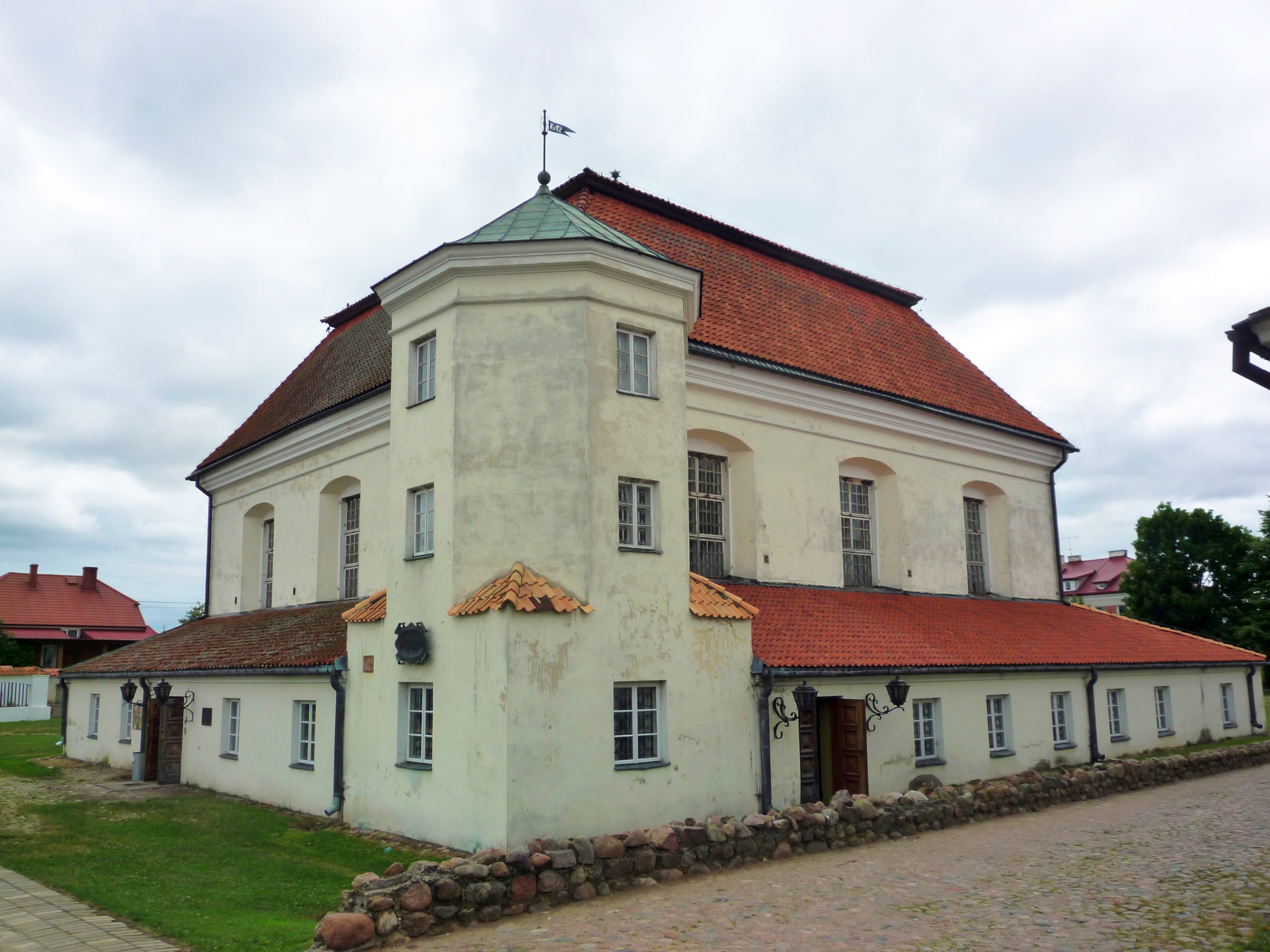

== See also ==
- History of the Jews in Poland
- List of mannerist structures in Northern Poland
