= Allan Hobson =

American psychiatrist (1933–2021)

John Allan Hobson
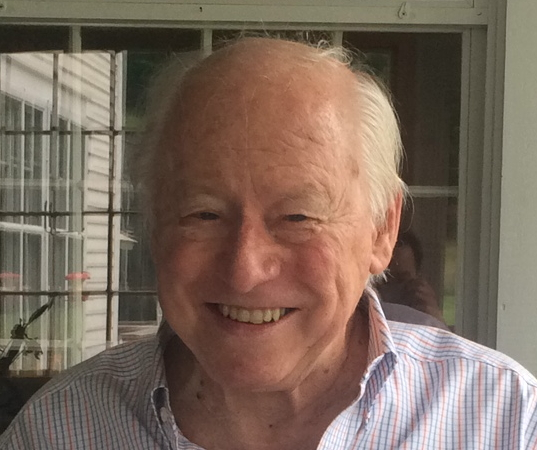
- Hobson in 2016
- Born: June 3, 1933
- Died: July 7, 2021 (aged 88)
- Education: Wesleyan University, Harvard Medical School
- Known for: Research on rapid eye movement sleep, activation-synthesis hypothesis
- Scientific career
- Fields: Psychiatry and dream research

John Allan Hobson (June 3, 1933 – July 7, 2021) was an American psychiatrist and dream researcher. He was known for his research on rapid eye movement sleep. He was Professor of Psychiatry, Emeritus, Harvard Medical School, and Professor, Department of Psychiatry, Beth Israel Deaconess Medical Center.

== Biography ==
Hobson grew up in Hartford, Connecticut. In 1955 he obtained his A.B. degree from Wesleyan University. Four years later he earned his MD degree at Harvard Medical School in 1959.

For the following two years he interned at Bellevue Hospital Center, New York. Then in 1960, he was a resident in Psychiatry at Massachusetts Mental Health Center in Boston for a year. Hobson then traveled to France where he was a Special Fellow of the National Institute of Mental Health for the Department of Physiology at the University of Lyon.

Upon returning to the United States, he went back to the Psychiatry at Massachusetts Mental Health Center in Boston until 1966.

He worked in numerous hospitals and research laboratories over the years and became the Director of the Laboratory of Neurophysiology at the Massachusetts Mental Health Center.

Hobson received four awards for his work:

- Admission to the Boylston Medical Society
- The Benjamin Rush Gold Medal for Best Scientific Exhibit
- Honorary Member of the American Psychiatric Association since 1978.
- Recipient of the 1998 Distinguished Scientist Award of the Sleep Research Society

In 2001, Hobson suffered a stroke affecting a part of his brainstem that he had previously studied for its impact on sleep. He was unable to sleep for eight days, resulting in various hallucinations, and didn't dream for a month. He documented the experience and later wrote about it multiple times. After the episode, and his doctors' lack of interest in his subjective experience, he became more open to the value of more subjective aspects of dreams.

Hobson's sense of humor was shown in such quips as: “The only known function of sleep is to cure sleepiness".

== Work ==
In addition to his many paid appointments, Hobson was actively involved with four groups relating to his neurological sleep research: the Society Memberships, the Society for Neuroscience, the Society for Sleep Research, the AAAS, and the International Association for the Study of Dreams (IASD), for which he used to be president.

=== Dream theories ===
Hobson's research specialty was quantifying mental events and correlating them with quantified brain events, with special reference to waking, sleeping and dreaming. Hobson's recent work puts forward the idea that during dreaming, different aspects of the conscious mind, Primary consciousness and Secondary consciousness, which are distinct from unified qualia, enter a self-referential interplay where by one constantly creates the environment of another. In this way, secondary consciousness performs the role of the dream environment itself, with the primary consciousness, not usually involved in self-awareness in waking life, becoming the object of conscious identity.

This process transpires for multiple reasons, but the primary one suggested is as a means to reductively simplify and stabilise the ideas learned in waking consciousness to less computationally complex ones, to improve overall system stability and reduce computational entropy, or free energy. Free energy is proposed by Hobson and Friston to correlate with capacity for an organism to experience shock or surprise. Thus, for humans, the process of daily learning becomes unsustainable without a corresponding process to revert from these neuroplastic increases in complexity.

Since 2009, he had been developing his theory of 'proto-consciousness.' According to this theory, dreaming is the most readily available representative of primary or proto-consciousness. Primary or proto-consciousness represents a relatively more primitive stage of consciousness that develops earlier in both evolutionary and ontological terms. In Psychodynamic Neurology (2015), he discussed the little-studied yet crucial role that proto-consciousness plays in overseeing and organizing the intricately complex growth of the individual, from zygote to fetus, through the trimesters in utero, and following parturition, and draws parallels with analogous phases of development in animals such as cats.

=== Dream interpretation ===
Hobson was critical of the idea that there are deep, nonphysiological, or hidden meanings in dreams, calling such notions "the mystique of fortune cookie dream interpretation." However, he used less confrontational phrasing in his critiques of Freud, and produced much academic work supporting the notion that dreams may contain analytically useful information, just not psychoanalytically useful information in a Freudian sense of the term.

Hobson asserted that dreams require no explicit training to decipher, and are certainly not encrypted to hide their meaning. Instead, as we can observe through dream reports, during REM sleep, it is emotional salience that steps into a directorial role, and the seemingly bizarre connections made within and between the scenes of dreams are trying to reveal rather than disguise whichever type of emotional salience we have associated with new, unpredicted sensory impressions with which we have been bombarded during waking periods. However, dreams may still be enormously useful to understanding our psychological state so long as we ground our interpretations in the hard science of how dreams work at the physiological level. In this sense, the emotions and feelings experienced in a dream can be viewed as the brain's 'best attempt' to communicate information to itself in a fractured state of awareness, as a means of preparing itself for waking consciousness the following day.

By exploring these emotions in an integrated state of wakeful awareness, according to Hobson, it may be possible to gain insight into what our brain was preparing itself for and why.

== Books ==
Hobson wrote, co-authored, or co-edited twenty-three books that relate to research on dreaming and waking consciousness and on mental health. The following is a complete list (as of July 2021):

- 1988, The Dreaming Brain. Basic Books.
- 1989, Abnormal States of Brain and Mind [Co-edited with Paul Adelman]. Birkhäuser Verlag.
- 1989, Sleep (Scientific American Library Series). W. H. Freeman & Co.
- 1992, Sleep and Dreams. (Carolina Biology Readers Series). Carolina Biological Supply Co. [16 pages].
- 1994, The Chemistry of Conscious States: How The Brain Changes Its Mind. Little, Brown & Co.
- 1999, Consciousness (Scientific American Library Series). W. H. Freeman & Co.
- 1999, Dreaming As Delirium: How the Brain Goes Out of Its Mind [This book a reprint of The Chemistry of Conscious States, originally published in 1994 (see above)]. MIT Press.
- 2000, The Conscious Exploration of Dreaming: Discovering How We Create and Control Our Dreams [Co-authored with Janice E Brooks and Jay Vogelsong]. AuthorHouse.
- 2001, Dream Drugstore: Chemically Altered States of Consciousness. Bradford Books.
- 2002, Dreaming: An Introduction to the Science of Sleep. Oxford University Press.
- 2002, Out of Its Mind: Psychiatry in Crisis, a Call for Reform [Co-authored with Jonathan A. Leonard]. Basic Books.
- 2005, 13 Dreams Freud Never Had. Pi Press.
- 2005, From Angels to Neurones: Art and the New Science of Dreaming. Mattioli.
- 2005, Dreaming: A Very Short Introduction. Oxford University Press.
- 2011, Dream Life: An Experimental Memoir. MIT Press.
- 2012, Creativity, [Illustration by Sofia Areal]. ISPA University Press.
- 2014, Ego Damage and Repair: Toward a Psychodynamic Neurology. Karnac Books.
- 2014, Dream consciousness: Allan Hobson's new approach to the brain and its mind [Edited by Nicholas Tranquillo]. Springer.
- 2015, Psychodynamic Neurology: Dreams, Consciousness, and Virtual Reality. CRC Press.
- 2018, Conscious States: Waking, Sleeping, and Dreaming. CreateSpace.
- 2018, Dreaming as Virtual Reality. Kindle Direct Publishing.
- 2021, Godbrain. Kindle Direct Publishing.
- 2021, Dream Self. Manuscript in preparation.
