= Secondary consciousness =

Awareness beyond things in the world in the present

Secondary consciousness is an individual's accessibility to their history and plans. The ability allows its possessors to go beyond the limits of the remembered present of primary consciousness. Primary consciousness can be defined as simple awareness that includes perception and emotion. As such, it is ascribed to most animals. By contrast, secondary consciousness depends on and includes such features as self-reflective awareness, abstract thinking, volition and metacognition. The term was coined by Gerald Edelman.

== Brief history and overview ==
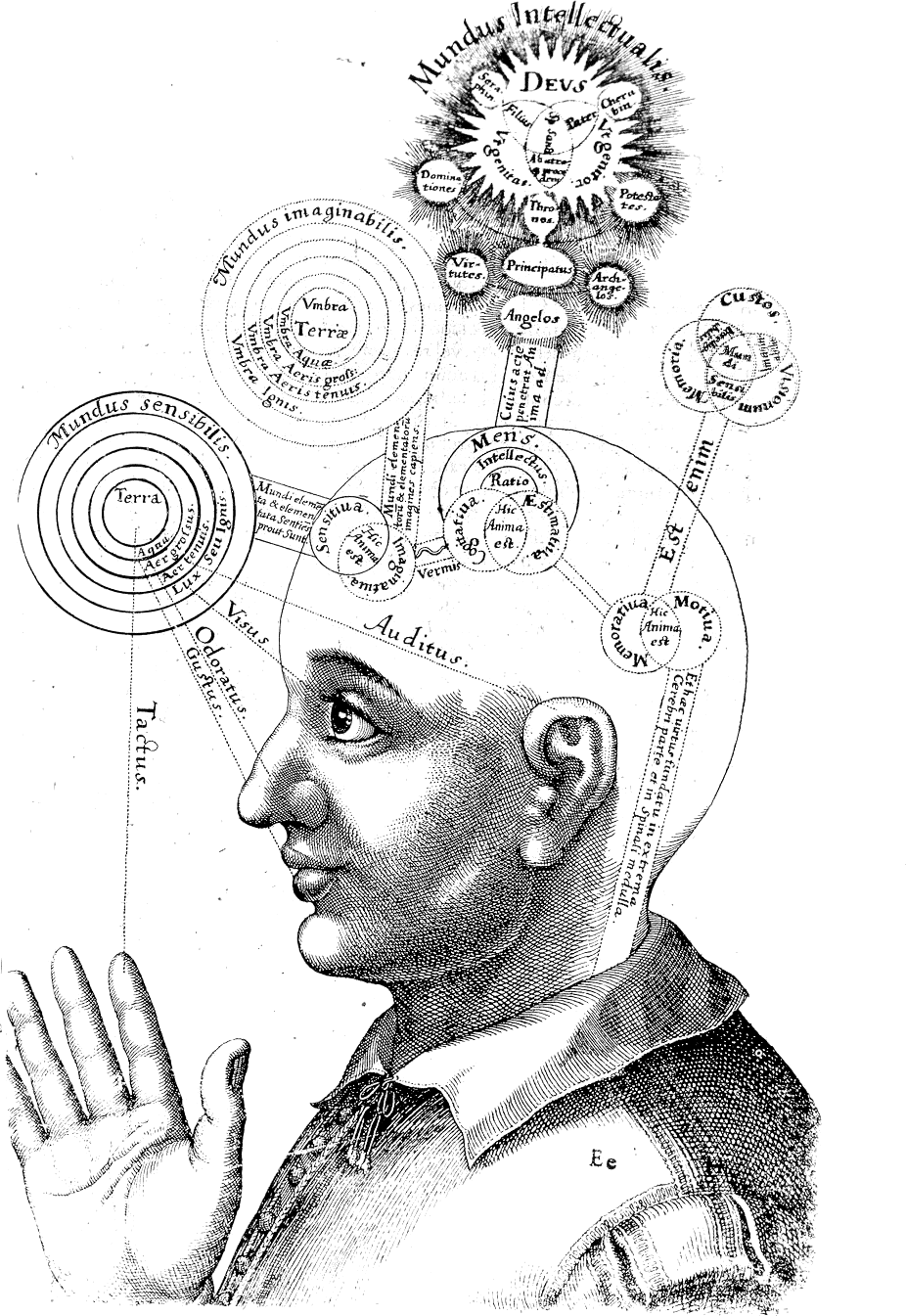
Representation of consciousness from the seventeenth century.

Since Descartes's proposal of dualism, it became a general consensus that the mind had become a matter of philosophy and that science was not able to penetrate the issue of consciousness- that consciousness was outside of space and time. However, over the last 20 years, many scholars have begun to move toward a science of consciousness. Such notable neuroscientists that have led the move to neural correlates of the self and of consciousness are Antonio Damasio and Gerald Edelman. Damasio has demonstrated that emotions and their biological foundation play a critical role in high level cognition, and Edelman has created a framework for analyzing consciousness through a scientific outlook. The current problem consciousness researchers face involves explaining how and why consciousness arises from neural computation. In his research on this problem, Edelman has developed a theory of consciousness, in which he has coined the terms primary consciousness and secondary consciousness. The author puts forward the belief that consciousness is a particular kind of brain process; linked and integrated, yet complex and differentiated.

== Evolution towards secondary consciousness ==
Edelman argues that the evolutionary emergence of consciousness depended on the natural selection of neural systems that gave rise to consciousness, but not on selection for consciousness itself. He is noted for his theory of neuronal group selection, also known as Neural Darwinism, which posits that consciousness is the product of natural selection. He believes consciousness is not something separate from the real world, thus the attempt to eliminate Descartes’ "dualism" as a possible consideration. He also rejects theories based on the notion that the brain is a computer or an instructional system. Instead, he suggests that the brain is a selectional system, one in which large numbers of variant circuits are generated epigenetically. He claims the potential connectivity in the neural net "far exceeds the number of elementary particles in the universe"

=== Dynamic core hypothesis and re-entry ===
Dynamic core hypothesis

Edelman elaborates on the dynamic core hypothesis (DCH), which describes the thalamocortical region- the region believed to be the integration center of consciousness. The DCH reflects the use and disuse of interconnected neuronal networks during stimulation of this region. It has been shown through computer models that neuronal groups existing in the cerebral cortex and thalamus interact in the form of synchronous oscillation. The interaction between distinct neuronal groups forms the "dynamic core" and may help explain the nature of conscious experience.

Re-entry

Edelman integrates the DCH hypothesis into Neural Darwinism, in which metastable interactions in the thalamocortical region cause a process of selectionism through re-entry, a host of internal feedback loops. "Re-entry", as Edelman states, "provides the critical means by which the activities of distributed multiple brain areas are linked, bound, and then dynamically altered in time during perceptual categorization. Both diversity and re-entry are necessary to account for the fundamental properties of conscious experience." These re-entrant signals are reinforced by areas Edelman calls "degenerate". Degeneracy doesn't imply deterioration, but instead redundancy as many areas in the brain handle the same or similar tasks. With this brain structure emerging in early humans, selection could favor certain brains and pass their patterns down the generations. Habits once erratic and highly individual ultimately became the social norm.

=== Exhibiting secondary consciousness in the animal kingdom ===
While animals with primary consciousness have long-term memory, they lack explicit narrative, and, at best, can only deal with the immediate scene in the remembered present. While they still have an advantage over animals lacking such ability, evolution has brought forth a growing complexity in consciousness, particularly in mammals. Animals with this complexity are said to have secondary consciousness. Secondary consciousness is seen in animals with semantic capabilities, such as the four great apes. It is present in its richest form in the human species, which is unique in possessing complex language made up of syntax and semantics. In considering how the neural mechanisms underlying primary consciousness arose and were maintained during evolution, it is proposed that at some time around the divergence of reptiles into mammals and then into birds, the embryological development of large numbers of new reciprocal connections allowed rich re-entrant activity to take place between the more posterior brain systems carrying out perceptual categorization and the more frontally located systems responsible for value-category memory. The ability of an animal to relate a present complex scene to its own previous history of learning conferred an adaptive evolutionary advantage. At much later evolutionary epochs, further re-entrant circuits appeared that linked semantic and linguistic performance to categorical and conceptual memory systems. This development enabled the emergence of secondary consciousness.

Self-recognition

For the advocates of the idea of a secondary consciousness, self-recognition serves as a critical component and a key defining measure. What is most interesting then, is the evolutionary appeal that arises with the concept of self-recognition. In non-human species and in children, the "mirror test" has been used as an indicator of self-awareness. In these experiments, subjects are placed in front of a mirror and provided with a mark that cannot be seen directly but is visible in the mirror.

There have been numerous findings in the past 30 years which display fairly clear evidence of possessors of self-recognition including the following animals:

- Chimpanzees, orangutans and gorillas.
- Dolphins and elephants. Findings suggestive of self-recognition in mammals other than apes have been reported.
- Magpies.

It should be mentioned that even in the chimpanzee, the species most studied and with the most convincing findings, clear-cut evidence of self-recognition is not obtained in all individuals tested. Occurrence is about 75% in young adults and considerably less in young and old individuals. For Monkeys, non-primate mammals, and in a number of bird species, exploration of the mirror and social displays were observed. However, hints at mirror-induced self-directed behavior have been obtained.

Self-recognition study in the magpie

It was recently thought that self-recognition was restricted to mammals with large brains and highly evolved social cognition but absent from animals without a neocortex. However, in a recent study, an investigation of self-recognition in corvids was carried out, and significant result quantified the ability of self-recognition in the magpie. Mammals and birds inherited the same brain components from their last common ancestor nearly 300 million years ago, and have since independently evolved and formed significantly different brain types. The results of the mirror and mark tests showed that neocortex-less magpies are capable of understanding that a mirror image belongs to their own body. The findings show that magpies respond in the mirror and mark test in a manner similar to apes, dolphins and elephants. This is a remarkable capability that, although not fully concrete in its determination of self-recognition, is at least a prerequisite of self-recognition. This is not only of interest regarding the convergent evolution of social intelligence; it is also valuable for an understanding of the general principles that govern cognitive evolution and their underlying neural mechanisms. The magpies were chosen to study based on their empathy/ lifestyle, a possible precursor for their ability of self-awareness.

Research on animal consciousness

Many researchers of consciousness have looked upon such types of research in animals as significant and interesting approaches. Ursula Voss of the Universität Bonn believes that the theory of protoconsciousness may serve as adequate explanation for self-recognition found in this bird species, as they would develop secondary consciousness during REM sleep. She added that many types of birds have very sophisticated language systems. Don Kuiken of the University of Alberta finds such research interesting as well as if we continue to study consciousness with animal models (with differing types of consciousness), we would be able to separate the different forms of reflectiveness found in today's world.

== Lucid vs. non-lucid dreaming as a model ==
In the last couple of decades, dream research has begun to focus on the field of consciousness. Through lucid dreaming, NREM sleep, REM sleep, and waking states, many dream researchers are attempting to scientifically explore consciousness. When exploring consciousness through the concept of dreams, many researchers believe the general characteristics that constitute primary and secondary consciousness remain intact.

=== Circuitry/anatomy ===
There have been studies used to determine what parts of the brain are associated with lucid dreaming, NREM sleep, REM sleep and waking states. The goal of these studies is often to seek physiological correlates of dreaming and apply them in the hopes of understanding relations to consciousness.

Prefrontal cortex

Some notable, albeit criticized findings include the functions of the prefrontal cortex that are most relevant to the self-conscious awareness that is lost in sleep, commonly termed as 'executive' functions. These include self-observation, planning, prioritizing and decision-making abilities, which are, in turn, based upon more basic cognitive abilities such as attention, working memory, temporal memory and behavioral inhibition Some experimental data which display differences between the self-awareness experienced in waking and its diminution in dreaming can be explained by deactivation of the dorsolateral prefrontal cortex during REM sleep. It has been proposed that deactivation results from a direct inhibition of the dorsolateral prefrontal cortical neurons by acetylcholine, the release of which is enhanced during REM sleep.

=== Research ===
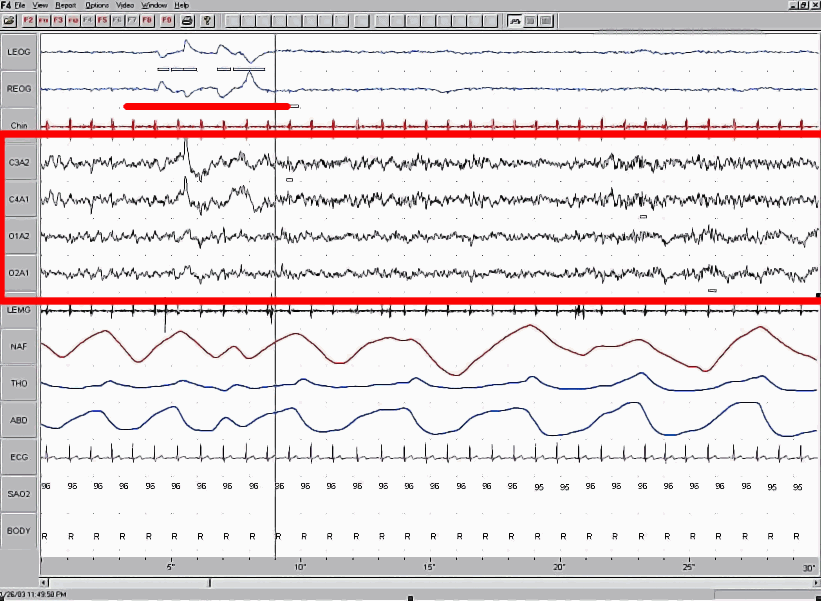
Polysomnographic record of REM Sleep. EEG highlighted by red box. Eye movement highlighted by red line.

Experiments and studies have been taken out to test neural correlations of lucid dreams with consciousness in dream research. Although there are many difficulties in conducting lucid dreaming research (e.g. number of lucid subjects, 'type' of lucidity achieved, etc.), there have been studies with significant results.

In one study, researchers sought physiological correlates of lucid dreaming. They showed that the unusual combination of hallucinatory dream activity and wake-like reflective awareness and agentive control experienced in lucid dreams is paralleled by significant changes in electrophysiology. Participants were recorded using 19-channel electroencephalography (EEG), and 3 achieved lucidity in the experiment. Differences between REM sleep and lucid dreaming were most prominent in the 40-Hz frequency band. The increase in 40-Hz power was especially strong at frontolateral and frontal sites. Their findings include the indication that 40-Hz activity holds a functional role in the modulation of conscious awareness across different conscious states. Furthermore, they termed lucid dreaming as a hybrid state, or that lucidity occurs in a state with features of both REM sleep and waking. In order to move from non-lucid REM sleep dreaming to lucid REM sleep dreaming, there must be a shift in brain activity in the direction of waking. Other well-known contributing scholars involved with lucid dream research and consciousness, yet primarily based in fields such as psychology and philosophy include:

- Stephen LaBerge – most known for his lucid dreaming education and facilitation. His technique of signaling to a collaborator monitoring his EEG with agreed-upon eye movements during REM sleep became the first published, scientifically-verified signal from a dreamer's mind to the outside world.
- Thomas Metzinger – known for his correlate of neuroscience and philosophy in understanding consciousness. He is praised for his ability to probe and link fundamental issues between these fields.
- Paul Tholey – most known for his research on rare, non-ordinary ego experiences and OBEs that arise with lucid dreaming. He has also studied the cognitive abilities of dream characters in lucid dreams through various experiments.

=== Protoconsciousness ===
The theory of protoconsciousness, developed by Allan Hobson, a creator of the Activation-synthesis hypothesis, has been developed through dream research and involves the idea of a secondary consciousness. Hobson suggests that brain states underlying waking and dreaming cooperate and that their functional interplay is crucial to the optimal functioning of both. Ultimately, he proposes the idea that REM sleep provides opportunities to the brain to prepare itself for its main integrative functions, including secondary consciousness, which would explain the developmental and evolutionary considerations to be taken with birds. This functional interplay which occurs during REM sleep constitutes a 'proto-conscious' state which preludes consciousness and can develop and maintain higher order consciousness.

=== AIM model ===
As the activation-synthesis hypothesis has evolved, it has metamorphosed into the three-dimensional framework known as the AIM model. The AIM model describes a method of mapping conscious states onto an underlying physiological state space. The AIM model relates not just to wake/sleep states of consciousness, but to all states of consciousness. By choosing activation, input source, and mode of neuromodulation as the three dimensions, the proposers believe to have selected "how much information is being processed by the brain (A), what information is being processed (I), and how it is being processed (M).

Hobson, Schott, and Stickgold propose three aspects of the AIM model:

- Conscious states are in large part determined by three interdependent processes, the level of brain activation ("A"), the origin of inputs ("I") to the activated areas, and the relative levels of activation of aminergic (noradrenergic and serotonergic) and cholinergic neuromodulators ("M").
- The AIM Model proposes that all of the universes' possible brain-mind states can be exemplified with a three-dimensional state space, with axes A, I, and M (activation, input, and mode), and that the state of the brain-mind at any given instant of time can be described as a point in this space. Since the AIM model represents brain-mind state as a sequence of points, Hobson adds that time is a fourth dimension of the model.
- The AIM model proposes that all three parameters defining the state space are continuous variables, and any point in the state space can in theory be occupied.

=== Criticism of lucid dreaming model ===
Secondary consciousness, as it remains a controversial topic, has received often contrasting findings and beliefs regarding lucid dreaming as a model, which entails the true difficulty in understanding consciousness.

The most common of recent criticisms include:

- The analyzed circuitry involved in lucid dreaming, REM sleep, NREM sleep, and waking states used to determine reflective ability. If, as many scholars have come to suggest, typical non-lucid REM dreaming reflects primary consciousness, the belief that typical non-lucid dreaming is accompanied by de-activation of the DL-PFC becomes significant. Although the Dorsolateral Prefrontal Cortex (DL-PFC) is believed to be the site of "executive ego control", it has never been tested.
- The idea of "executive ego control" and its articulation. Kuiken has stated that typical non-lucid REM dreaming may involve another form of self-regulative activity that is not related to activation of the DL-PFC. There is evidence that the subtle self-regulation characteristic of musical improvisation is similar in pattern to the activations and de-activations (including de-activation of the DL-PFC) that characterize REM sleep. It is probable that the loss of one conscious form of self-regulation during non-lucid dreaming creates the possibility for the adoption of an unconscious, but "fluid" form of self-regulation that resembles that of musical improvisation. It is possible, he believes, that non-lucid dreaming entails self-regulated but fluid openness to 'what comes,’ rather than the direct self-monitoring and inhibition that enable 'rational' planning and decision making. In a recent study, it has been proven that unconscious task-relevant signals can actively trigger and initiate an inhibition to respond, thereby breaking the alleged close correlation between consciousness and inhibitory control. This proves that self-regulative activities (a characteristic of secondary consciousness for many scholars) can occur independently of consciousness of consciousness.
- Using lucid dreaming as a model of secondary consciousness. Some scholars believe lucid dreaming does not constitute a single type of reflectiveness. It is already argued that there may be different kinds of reflectiveness that might define secondary consciousness, so the difficulty in using lucid dreaming as a model is greatly increased. For example, there may be a realization in a dream that will often go without gaining control. There are different amounts of 'executive functions' taken between lucid dreams, thus displaying how there are many different types of reflectiveness involved in 'lucid' dreaming.

== See also ==
- Consciousness
- Lucid dream
- Primary consciousness
- Neural Darwinism
