= Primary consciousness =

Awareness of things in the world in the present

Primary consciousness is a term the American biologist Gerald Edelman coined to describe the ability, found in humans and some animals, to integrate observed events with memory to create an awareness of the present and immediate past of the world around them. This form of consciousness is also sometimes called "sensory consciousness". Put another way, primary consciousness is the presence of various subjective sensory contents of consciousness such as sensations, perceptions, and mental images. For example, primary consciousness includes a person's experience of the blueness of the ocean, a bird's song, and the feeling of pain. Thus, primary consciousness refers to being mentally aware of things in the world in the present without any sense of past and future; it is composed of mental images bound to a time around the measurable present.

Conversely, higher order consciousness can be described as being "conscious of being conscious"; it includes reflective thought, a concept of the past, and speculation about the future.

Primary consciousness can be subdivided into two forms, focal awareness and peripheral awareness. Focal awareness encompasses the center of attention, whereas peripheral awareness consists of things outside the center of attention, which a person or animal is only dimly aware of.

== Theories ==
One prominent theory for the neurophysiological basis of primary consciousness was proposed by Gerald Edelman. This theory of consciousness is premised upon three major assumptions:

1. The laws of physics apply to consciousness, which rules out concepts such as spirits and a soul and allows for a purely physiological model of consciousness.
2. Consciousness is an evolved characteristic, which means it is a helpful characteristic from a Darwinian perspective.
3. There is no such thing as a "qualia-free" observer. Qualia are collections of personal or subjective experiences, feelings, and sensations that inevitably come with human awareness.

Edelman's theory focuses on two nervous system organizations: the brainstem and limbic systems on one side and the thalamus and cerebral cortex on the other side. The brain stem and limbic system take care of essential body functioning and survival, while the thalamocortical system receives signals from sensory receptors and sends out signals to voluntary muscles such as those of the arms and legs. The theory asserts that the connection of these two systems during evolution helped animals learn adaptive behaviors. This connection allows past signals related to values set by the limbic-brain stem system and categorized signals from the outside world to be correlated, resulting in memory in conceptual areas. This memory is then linked to the organism's current perception, which results in an awareness of the present, or primary consciousness. In other words, Edelman posits that primary consciousness arises from the correlation of conceptual memory to a set of ongoing perceptual categorizations—a "remembered present".

Other scientists have argued against Edelman's theory, instead suggesting that primary consciousness might have emerged with the basic vegetative systems of the brain. That is, the evolutionary origin might have come from sensations and primal emotions arising from sensors and receptors, both internal and surface, signaling that the well-being of the creature was immediately threatened—for example, hunger for air, thirst, hunger, pain, and extreme temperature change. This is based on neurological data showing the thalamic, hippocampal, orbitofrontal, insula, and midbrain sites are the key to consciousness of thirst.

These scientists also point out that the cortex might not be as important to primary consciousness as some neuroscientists have believed. Evidence of this lies in the fact that studies show that systematically disabling parts of the cortex in animals does not remove consciousness. Another study found that children born without a cortex are conscious. Instead of cortical mechanisms, these scientists emphasize brainstem mechanisms as essential to consciousness. Still, these scientists concede that higher order consciousness does involve the cortex and complex communication between different areas of the brain.

== Neurophysiological basis ==
Physiologically, three fundamental facts stand out about primary consciousness:

1. Waking consciousness is associated with low amplitude, irregular EEG activity in the 20–70 Hz range.
  - Conversely, unconscious states like deep sleep, coma, general anesthesia, and epileptic states of absence show a predominance of low frequency, high-amplitude and more regular voltages at less than 4Hz.
2. Consciousness seems to be intrinsically associated with the thalamus and cortex, even if the extent to which this true is argued among scientists.
  - Damage to the brainstem or thalamus can abolish consciousness, while damage to the sensory cortex appears to delete specific conscious features such as color vision, visual motion, conscious experiences of objects and faces, and the like.
3. Consciousness is distinctively associated with widespread brain activation related to the conscious content.
  - Perhaps two dozen experiments show that sensory input supporting consciousness spreads from the sensory cortex to parietal, prefrontal, and medial-temporal cortex, while closely matched input that does not reach consciousness activates mainly local sensory regions. Further, the widespread activity appears to involve more globally coordinated activity.

== Measurement ==
To be fully comprehensive, measures of consciousness must not only define and distinguish between conscious and unconscious states, but must also provide a guide by which the conscious level, or extent of consciousness, can be determined. Measures of consciousness are each associated with particular theories.

Certain defining theories are included below:

Worldly discrimination theory asserts that any mental state that is manifested in behavior is conscious; thus, an organism is consciously aware of something in the world if it can discriminate it with choice behavior. Signal detection theory quantifies discriminability of a stimulus among a set of different stimuli. Integration theories focus on finding a divide between conscious and unconscious processes. According to integration theories, conscious contents are widely available to many cognitive and/or neural processes.

These theories are then accompanied with measures of the level of consciousness, which are subdivided into behavioral measures and physiological measures.

=== Behavioral measures ===
Behavioral measures of primary consciousness can be either objective or subjective. Regarding objective measures, knowledge is unconscious if it expresses itself in an indirect test. For example, the ability to pick which item might come next in a series can indicate unconscious knowledge of regularities in sequences. "Strategic control measures" use a person's ability to deliberately use or not use knowledge according to instructions. If they use information despite intentions not to use it, it indicates unconscious knowledge. Post-decision wagering can also be used. In this method, subjects make a first-order discrimination (i.e. a choice) and then place a wager regarding the outcome of the discrimination. Some scientists view this as a direct and objective measure of consciousness, and it can be used with children and animals. However, this method has been argued to be subjective and indirect.

=== Physiological measures ===
Event-related cortical potentials (ERPs) have been used to assess whether a stimulus is consciously perceived or not. These EEG measures either float free of theory, gaining credibility through reliable correlation, or assume a version of integration theory in which the appearance of a particular ERP indicates global availability or locally recurrent processing.

Abundant evidence indicates that consciously perceived inputs elicit widespread brain activation, as compared with inputs that do not reach consciousness.

The dynamic core hypothesis (DCH) proposes that consciousness arises from neural dynamics in the thalamocortical system, as measured by the quantity neural complexity (CN). CN is an information-theoretic measure; the CN value is high if each subset of a neural system can take on many different states, and if these states make a difference to the rest of the system. The information integration theory of consciousness (IITC) shares with the DCH the idea that conscious experiences provide informative discriminations among a vast repertoire of possible experiences. In the IITC, the quantity phi is defined as the information that is integrated across the informational "weakest link" of a system. Importantly, phi is a measure of the capacity of a neural system to integrate information, whereas CN is a measure of the actual dynamics of the system. A third measure, causal density (CD), measures the fraction of causal interactions among elements of a system that are statistically significant.

=== Challenges in measuring ===
Subjective measures are always indirect and can be vulnerable to many biases (e.g., reluctance to report uncertain experiences). Also, because metacognitive conscious content assumes primary consciousness but not vice versa, subjective measures risk missing or rejecting the presence of sensory consciousness simply because metacognition isn't observed.

Furthermore, there is the problem of post-decision wagering, which has been criticized because there is a possibility that advantageous wagering could be learned unconsciously; as a result, post-decision wagering would not in fact be considered a conscious behavior. For example, individual differences in risk aversion may lead to variations in wagering performance even with the same underlying conscious phenomenology.

Thus, although behavioral measures are mostly used for assessing which contents are conscious, some brain-based measures seem better suited for measuring conscious level. Objective measures also have their challenges, however. First, objective measures still require a response criterion, for example the decision of whether or not to push a button. Second, they may not even measure consciousness at all because many behavioral proxies, such as forced-choice decision accuracy, are capable of being learned unconsciously.

== Miscellaneous studies ==
=== In lucid dreams ===
Hobson asserts that the existence of lucid dreaming means that the human brain can simultaneously occupy two states: waking and dreaming. The dreaming portion has experiences and therefore has primary consciousness, while the waking self recognizes the dreaming and can be seen as having a sort of secondary consciousness in the sense that there is an awareness of mental state. Studies have been able to show that lucid dreaming is associated with EEG power and coherence profiles that are significantly different from both non-lucid dreaming and waking. Lucid dreaming situates itself between those two states. Lucid dreaming is characterized by more 40 Hz power than non-lucid dreaming, especially in frontal regions. Since it is 40 Hz power that has been correlated with waking consciousness in previous studies, it can be suggested that enough 40 Hz power has been added to the non-lucid dreaming brain to support the increase in subjective awareness that permits lucidity but not enough to cause full awakening.

Dreaming is thus a virtual reality experience with a remarkably predictive simulation of external reality. Lucid dreamers may experience primary consciousness (the dream) and secondary consciousness (the waking) separately but simultaneously. Moreover, primary consciousness has recently been proposed by us to be characteristic of dreaming. It remains to be seen whether the enactment of dream behaviors uses the same brain processes as those that mediate those very behaviors in waking, and whether conscious within a dream is governed by the same processes.

=== In epileptic seizures ===
Studies show that it is possible to retain primary consciousness and even secondary consciousness during complex partial epileptic seizures. One study analyzed 40 patients with complex partial seizures to determine their level of consciousness during seizures. The data acquired was based on patients' subjective descriptions of their experience and descriptions from family members who witnessed the seizures. This study found there was a complete absence of consciousness in only 65% of people during the core period of the seizures. Meanwhile, 35% of seizures included some form of primary consciousness. Five seizure descriptions even reported some form of secondary consciousness, albeit short and intermittent. The level and contents of consciousness during epileptic seizures show considerable variability.

=== In thirst ===
In one study, 10 adult males underwent positron emission tomography scans in three different scenarios:

1. During generation of moderate thirst by infusion of intravenous hypertonic saline 0.51 M
2. After wetting of the mouth with water to remove the sensation of dryness
3. 3, 14, 45, and 60 minutes after drinking water to fully quench thirst

The data suggest that the anterior and posterior cingulate cortex as well as the anterior wall of the third ventricle, are major elements of a circuit including thalamic, hippocampal, orbitofrontal, insula, and midbrain sites that are needed for the generation of consciousness of thirst. This study shows that consciousness of some key sensations like thirst is governed by the oldest regions of the brain, which raises the question of whether it is really then possible to say when primary consciousness developed.

=== In meditation ===
In some types of meditation/yoga it is possible to have the experience known as Samadhi, where there is inner alertness but no object of consciousness. This mental state corresponds with specific physiological parameters.

== See also ==
- Consciousness
- Lucid dream
- Secondary consciousness
- Neural Darwinism
