= Gammel Strand 38 =

Building in Copenhagen

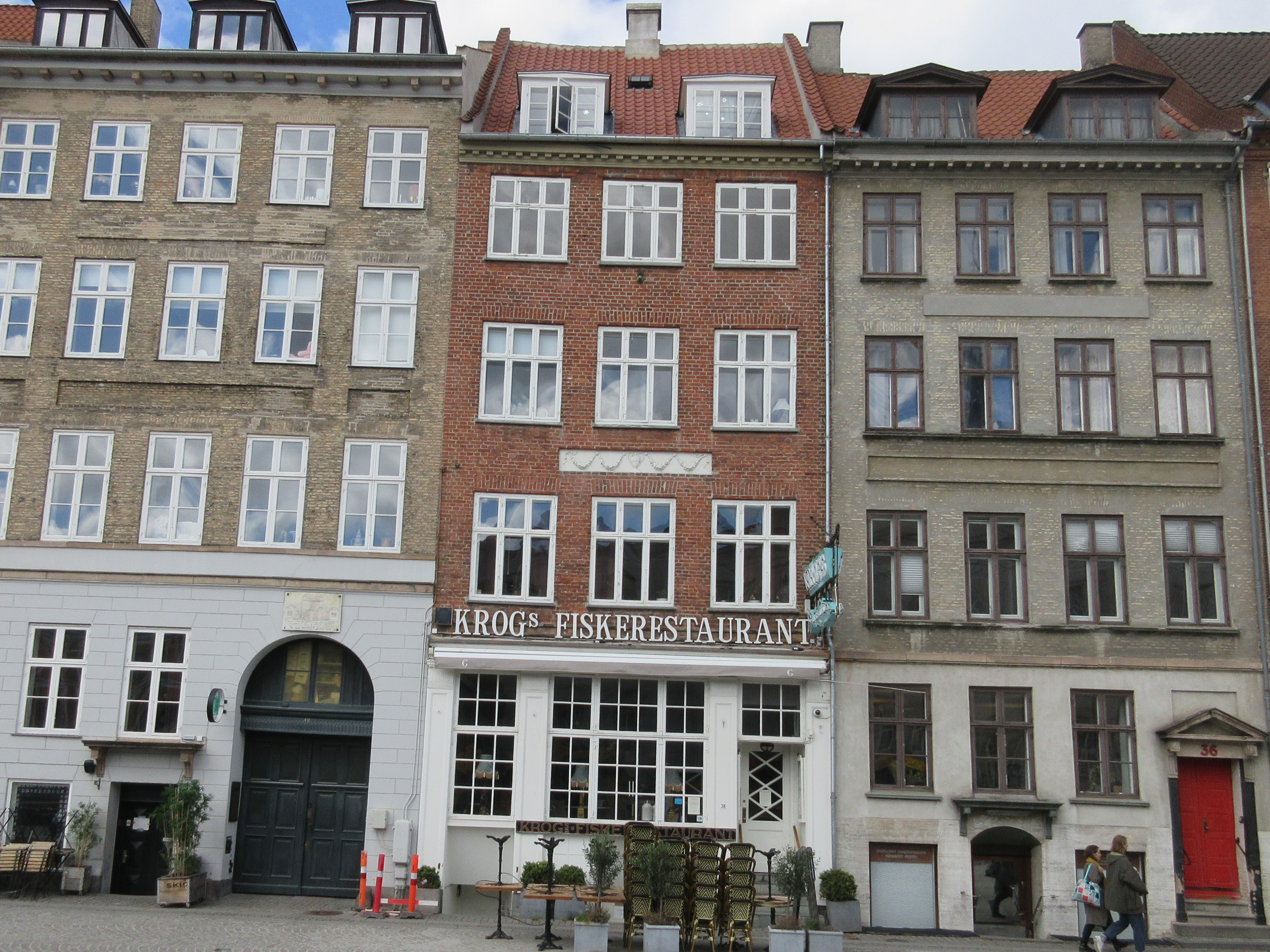
- Interactive map of the Gammel Strand 38 area

General information
- Location: Copenhagen, Denmark
- Coordinates: 55°40′39.86″N 12°34′42.2″E
- Renovated: 1799

Gammel Strand 38 is a Neoclassical property overlooking Slotsholmen Canal in the Olt Town of Copenhagen, Denmark. The building was listed in the Danish registry of protected buildings and places in 1945. Krogs Fiskerestaurant, one of Copenhagen's oldest fish restaurants, occupies the ground floor of the building. Notable former residents include author Thomasine Gyllembourg and her son Johan Ludvig Heiberg, banker Gottlieb Abrahamson Gedalia and chocolate manufacturer Anthon Berg.

== History ==
=== Site history, 1599–1795 ===
A house was built on the site by the king in 1620–321. It was occupied from 1622 by Johan Ettersen, first as tenant and then as owner. On 31 July 1645, he mortgaged the property. On 14 March 1647, he sold it to mayor Peder Pederse and wife Margrete Clausdatter. On 25 July 1681, it was sold by their heirs to barkeeper Morten Boldt. On 29 June 1685, he sold it to master barber/surgeon Christian Franck. His property was listed in Copenhagen's first cadastre of 1689 as No. 10 in Strand Quarter. Franck's widow was later married to surgeon Hermand Baumand. On 18 June 1706, he sold the property to teahouse-owner Oluf Nielsen Lind. He owned it until at least 1728.

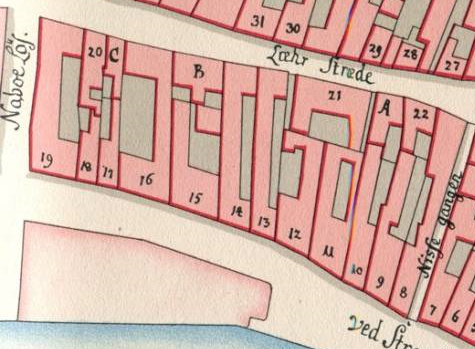
No. 10 seen on a detail from Christian Gedde's map of Strand Quarter, 1756

The property was again listed as No. 10 in the new cadastre of 1756 and was then owned by one glass merchant Meer.

At the time of the 1787 census, No. 10 was home to five households. Johanne Magrete Bautler, a distiller, resided in the building with his wife Anne Dorthe Linck and their five children (aged seven to 20). Johanne Magrete Bautler, an 82-year-old widow, resided in the building with her 40-year-old daughter Johanne Magrete Bautler and 18-year-old nephew Søren Lucke. Adam Gottlob Lowsow, bell-ringer at the Synagogue, resided in the building with his wife Dorothea Sophia Krog and their eight children. Ole Wærn, the proprietor of a tavern in the basement, resided in the associated dwelling with his wife Sidse Maria, their six children (aged one to 15) and one maid.

=== Christian Petersen and the new building ===
The property was destroyed in the Copenhagen Fire of 1795, together with most of the other buildings in the area. The fire came from the east and was stopped a little further to the west at the street naboløs. The present building on the site was constructed in 1798–1799 for coppersmith Christian Petersen.

At the time of the 1801 census, No. 10 was home to four households. Christian Petersen resided in one of the apartments with his wife Marie Elisabeth Petersen, four coppersmiths, four apprentices, two maids and one lodger. Gustav Proscht. a clerk, resided in another apartment with his wife Ane Catharine Proscht and their five children (aged four to 17). Frideriche Sophie Storph, a 75-year-old widow, resided in a third apartment with two maids. Jean Jaques Christophlesen Battier (Johan Jacob Battier, 1773–1805), a student, son of Christoph Battier (1733-1786), resided in the building with his wife Margrethe Thomsen Mitchell, their one-year-old son Frideriche Sophie Battier and one maid. Ludvig Meyer (1780-1854), a professor, resided on the second floor with his wife Charlotte Platou and one maid.

The property was listed as No. 9 in the new cadastre of 1806. It was at that time still owned by Christian Petersen.

The author Thomasine Gyllembourg and her son Johan Ludvig Heiberg were among the residents of the building in 1817–18.

=== 1840–1900 ===
At the time of the 1840 census, No. 9 was home to five households. A restaurant had opened on the ground floor. Jørgen Fischer, the restaurateur, resided in the associated dwelling with his wife Maria Funch, their three children (aged nine to 14) and one maid. Jens Larsen, a merchant (grosserer), resided in the basement with his wife Ellen Chatrine Kiøbenhavn, their two daughters (aged 13 and 15) and one maid. Johannes Hansen, a bookkeeper at Tallotteriet with title of kammerråd, resided on the first floor with his wife Christine Fischer, their 21-year-old daughter Sophie Magdelene Hansen and one maid. Janette Petersen, a 50-year-old "institute manager" (institutbestyrerinde), resided on the third floor with four girls in the age range 12–15, a housekeeper and a maid.

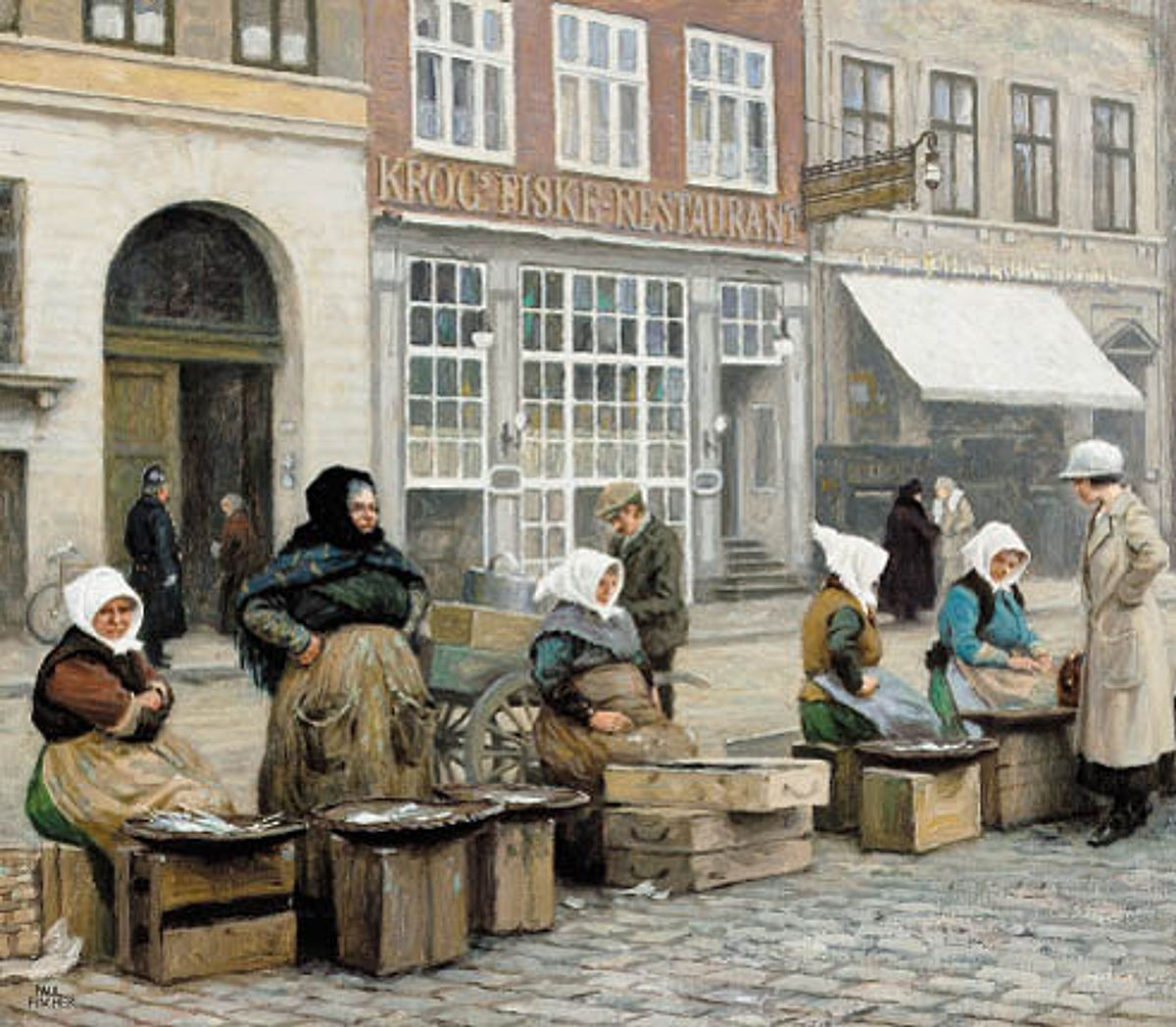
Paul Fischer: Fishwives outside Krogh's Fish Restaurant

The banker Gottlieb Abrahamson Gedalia (1816–1892) resided in one of the apartments in 1852–53 and again in the years around 1886.

The property was home to 23 residents at the time of the 1860 census. Niels Pedersen, a fishmonger, resided on the ground floor with his wife Dorthea Pedersen, their two children (aged two and four) and one lodger. Theis Hein, a courier at Rigsdagen, resided on the first floor with his wife Ane Margrethe Hein, their 18-year-old daughter Hulda Hein and two lodgers. Petrea Sophie Juul, widow of a kammerråd, resided on the second floor with one maid. Peder Gerhar Baagøe, a music teacher, resided on the third floor with his wife Thora Mathile Baagøe f. Bierregaard and their two children (aged one and three). Inger Marie Borup (née Sørensen), the proprietor of the tavern in the basement, resided in the associated dwelling with her 16-year-old daughter Conrad Sophus Borup and five lodgers.

Anthon Berg (1829–1916) resided in one of the apartments from 1884 to 1887. He started his production of chocolate in the ground floor on 7 April 1884.

=== 20th century ===
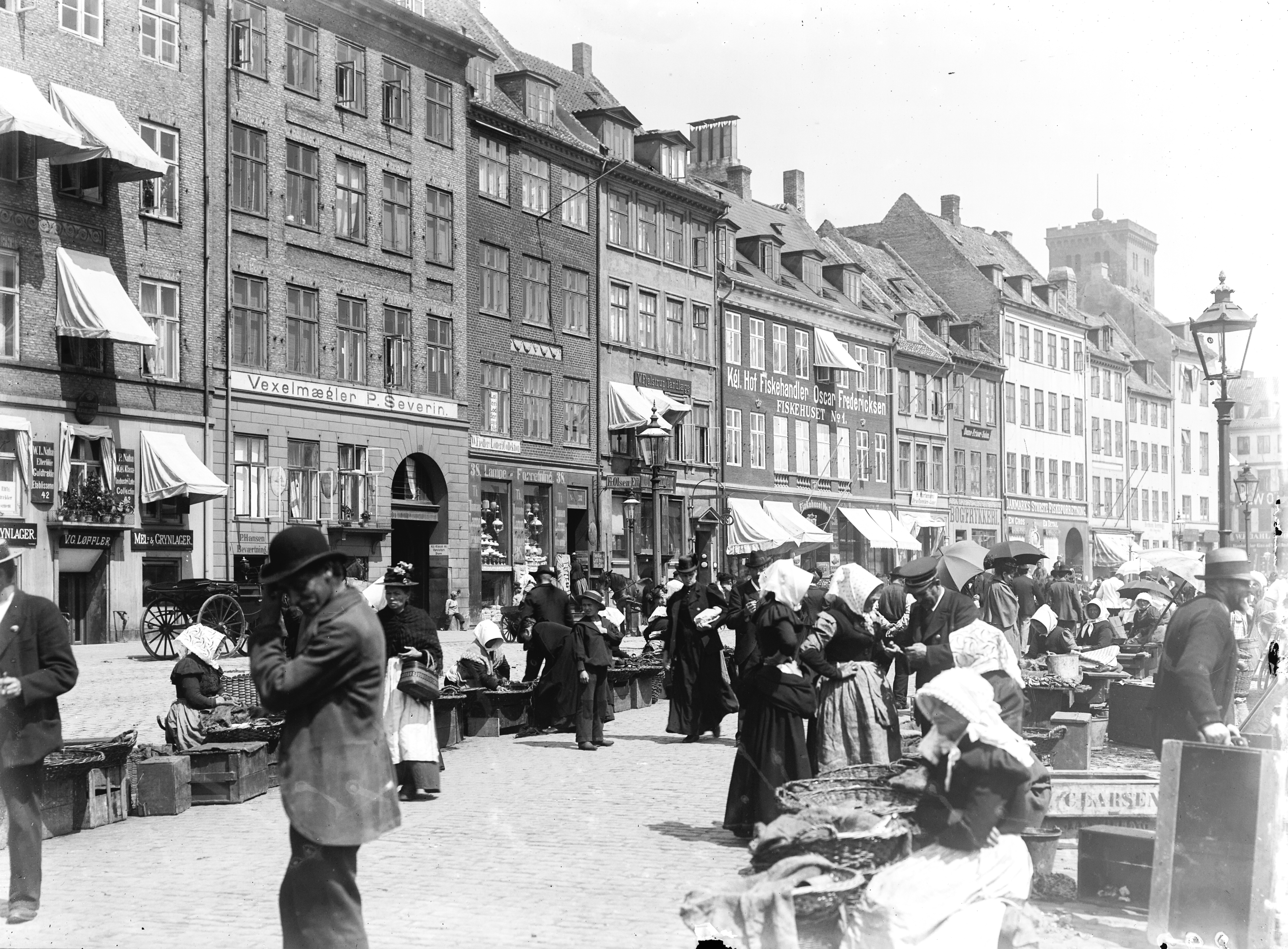
The property seen in a photograph by Frederik Riise from c. 1900.

Christian Krogopened a fish restaurant in the building in 1910. The building was owned by wholesale merchant (grosserer) Hans Christian Christensen (1864-) in 1908. He also owned Vestergade 7.

The building was listed on the Danish registry of protected buildings and places in 1945. The scope of the heritage listing was expanded in 1990.

== Architecture ==
Gammel Strand 38 is a just three bays wide building constructed in red brick with four storeys over a walk-out basement. The ground floor is clad in painted wood with pilasters between the windows while the three upper floors stand in undressed brick. Between the central windows of the first and second floor is a recessed rectangular frieze with vase and festoons. The facade is finished by a plastered dentilated cornice. A seven bays long side wing extends from the rear side of the building.

== Today ==
Krogs Fiskerestaurant, a fish restaurant, is based in the ground floor.
