= André Noël =

André Noël may refer to:

- André Noël (sport shooter)
- André Noël (chef)
