= André Noël (chef) =

French chef who served of King Frederick II of Prussia

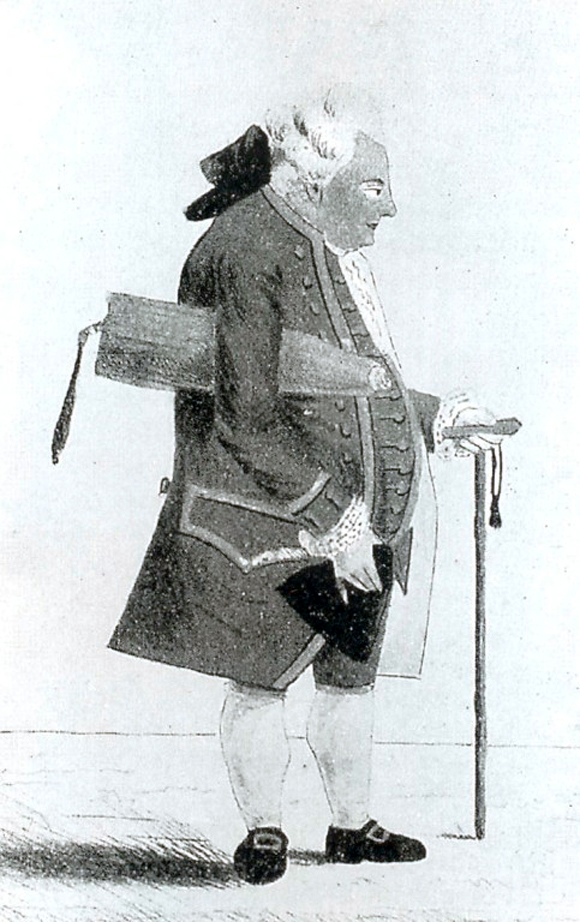
- André Noël in full regalia, umbrella under arm
- Born: 1726; Périgueux
- Died: May 4, 1801 (aged 74–75)
- Occupations: Cook, Maître d'hôtel

André Noël, born in Périgueux in 1726 and died in Berlin on May 4, 1801, was a French chef in the service of King Frederick II of Prussia. He created famous dishes for the royal table, such as a "bombe de Sardanapale", but is also credited with making a pheasant pâté that La Mettrie is said to have enjoyed to the point of dying of indigestion. In 1772, King Frederick II dedicated a long poem to him. After his death, he appeared in several novels.

== Biography ==
=== From Périgueux to Potsdam ===
André Noël - or Nouël - was born in Périgueux in 1726, in the Limogeanne district. His father was a flourishing confectioner with "prodigious talent for pâtés", (Note: At the time, pâté-making was the preserve of pastry-makers (Pitte, Jean-Robert (1996). Histoire de l'alimentation: Naissance et expansion des restaurants (in French). Fayard. p. 770.), a profession practiced by both Noël the father in Angoulême and the famous Courtois in Périgueux.) which he shipped all over Europe. Almost nothing is known of his career prior to his departure for Prussia, Philippe Meyzie cautioning against any a posteriori reconstruction of a "mythologized past" and Hans-Uwe Lammel suggesting that Noël's father's fame may have played a role in his son's career.

In 1755, André Noël was hired as a cook at the court of King Frederick II of Prussia, at the Sanssouci Palace in Potsdam. This can be contextualized in two ways:

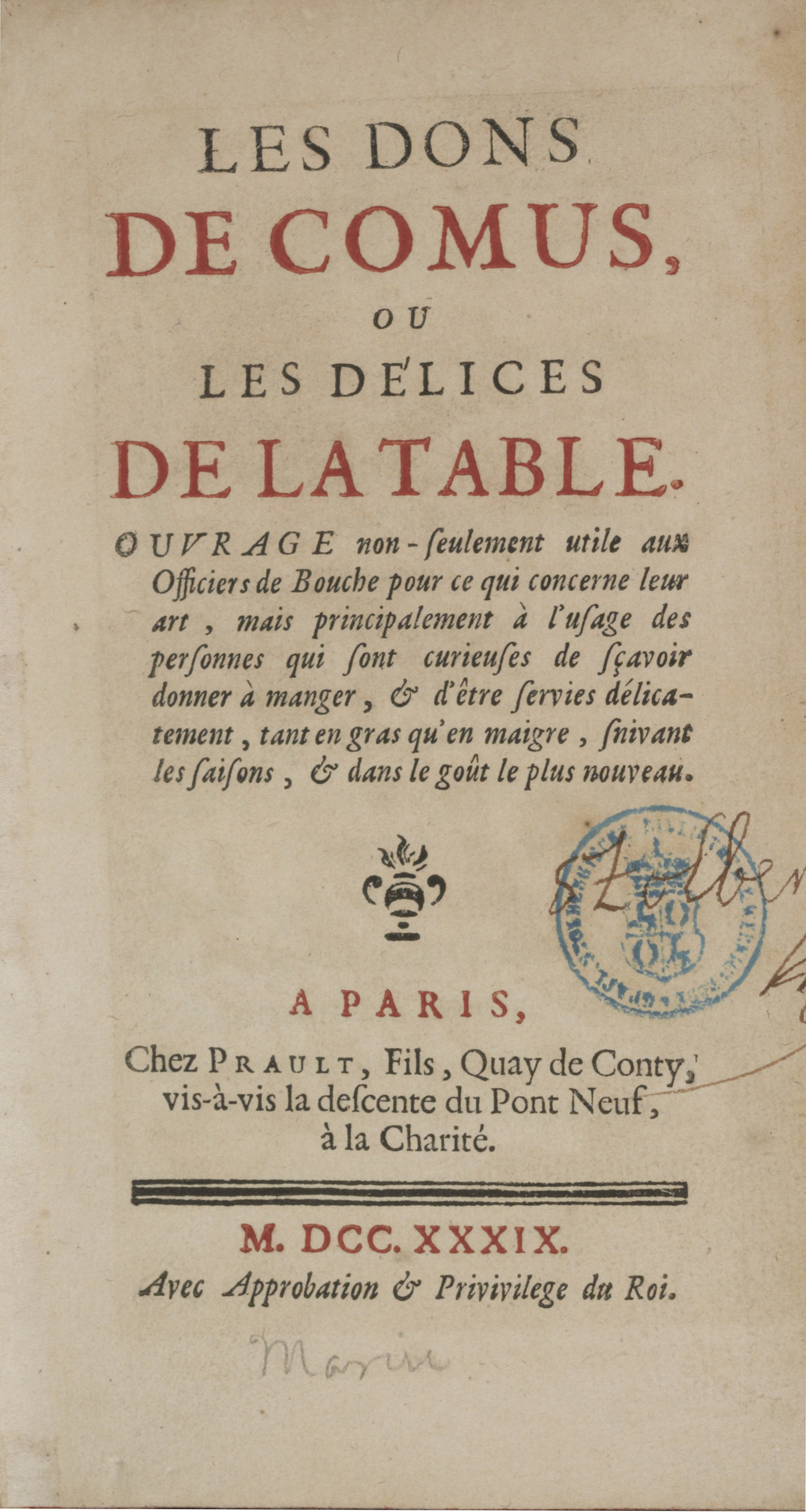
Title page from Les Dons de Comus by François Marin (1739).

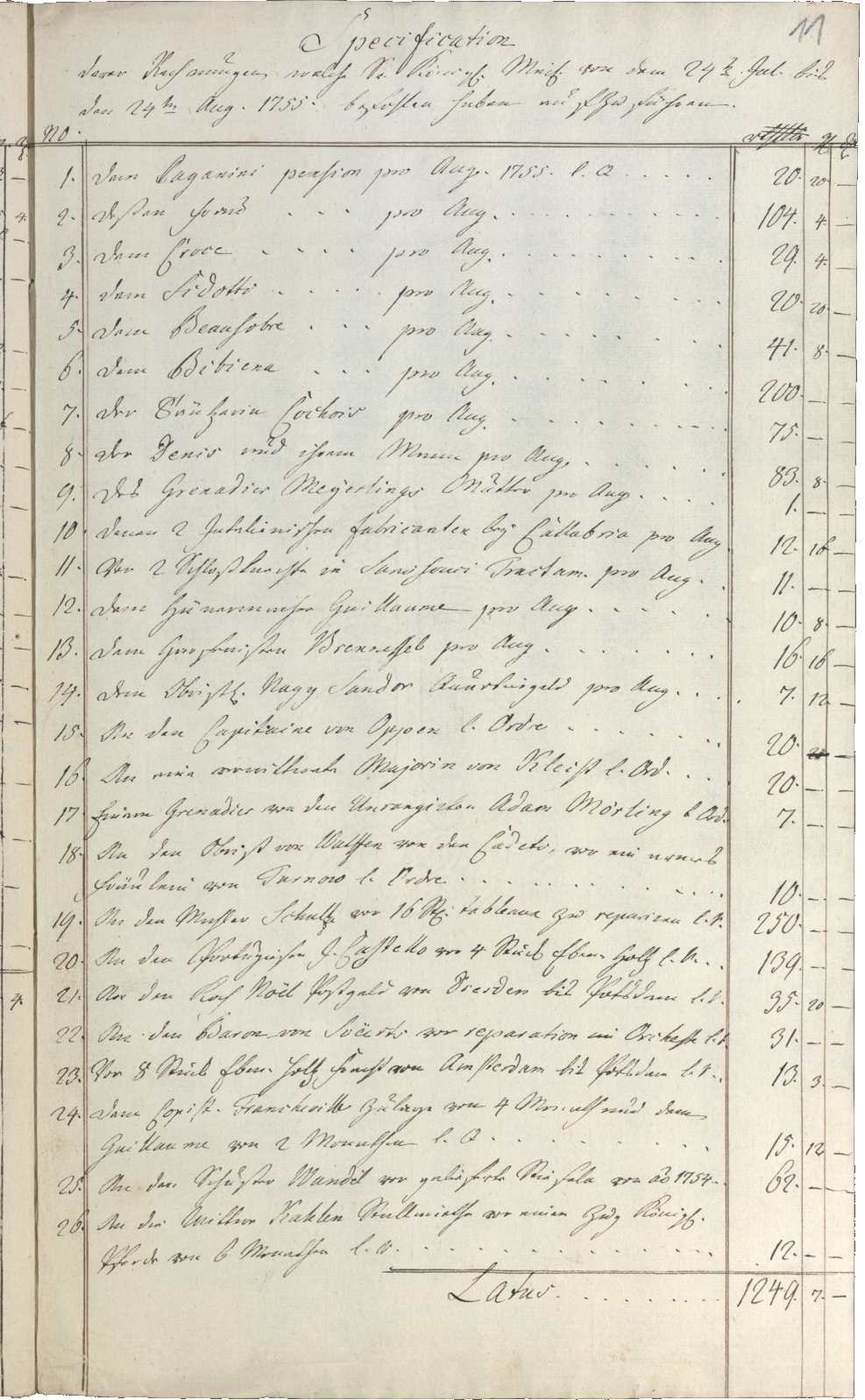
One of the first entries for André Noël in the Sanssouci Palace account book: in August 1755, reimbursement of his travel expenses from Dresden to Potsdam (line 21).

- At the time, it was considered best to "only cook with French cooks". French chefs like Vincent La Chapelle were sought after by European princes. Some of them, such as Frederick II, "to amuse themselves, do not disdain to speak sometimes about cooking", as stated in the warning to Les Dons de Comus, a manual of "nouvelle cuisine" published in 1739 by François Marin. Frederick II had also read Les Dons de Comus, even though French and German cuisine coexisted at his table. He employed French chefs, such as the "famous Duval", who entered his service in 1731. (Note: In a letter from 1737, Frédéric felt that his chef did "wonders" to "stuff the bellies" of his guests Frédéric II (1846), p. 289Read online at: http://friedrich.uni-trier.de/fr/oeuvres/16/289/.) In 1744, another French chef, Émile Joyard from Lyon, son-in-law of Antoine Pesne, joined Frederick's staff; he remained maître d'hôtel for thirty years. (Note: In an epistle from 1760, Frédéric evokes. "Joyard [who] wants to give himself to the devil / To invent dishes, worthy gifts of Comus, / Under their disguises hardly yet known" (Frédéric II (1760). Œuvres du philosophe de Sans-Souci (in French). p. 143.).)
- In the 18th century, pâtés du Périgord, particularly those from Périgueux, were "the most expensive of entremets" and a renowned noble gift. However, the reference to Périgord most often refers not to the geographical origin of the dish, but to its preparation "à la Périgord", i.e. with the incorporation of truffles. As early as 1743, Frederick II's correspondence attests to his fondness for these pâtés. He "loved truffles and sent for a pâté from Périgord every year", (Note: Périgueux pâté was best served in winter, in earthenware terrines with lids.) in particular those from Courtois, a pastry-maker in Périgueux, of which he "was particularly fond". He also sent them as gifts. The king remained "particularly" attached to pâtés throughout his life, a French diplomat noting that as he neared death, he ate nothing but "pâtés of eel and Périgueux".

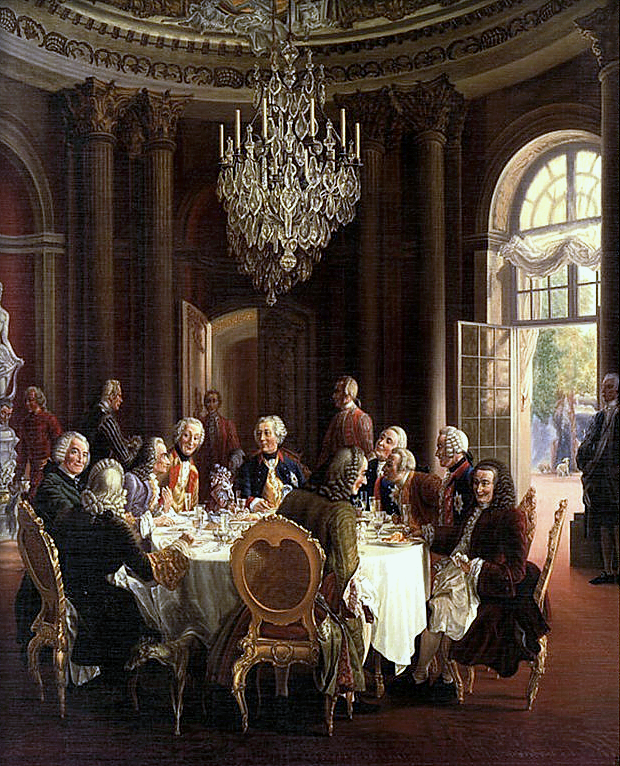
In this reconstruction by Adolph von Menzel, Casanova, La Mettrie and Voltaire dine with Frederick II.

=== Career and end of life in Berlin ===
Casanova met André Noël at Madame Rufin's in 1764, during a stay in Berlin. (Note: Casanova adds that Frederick II "did not live like Lucullus, for [...] this king had only one cook and Noël had only one kitchen assistant or marmiton " (Casanova & Vèze (1931), p. 48). This testimony is contradicted by that of Thiébault, who refers to a team of twelve cooks. Even an insulting libel attributed four cooks to Frederick II (de la Beaumelle, Laurent Angliviel (1752). Idée de la personne, de la manière de vivre, & de la cour du roi de Prusse.) and in the midst of war, when one of his French cooks died, the king immediately sought to replace him and gave "Noël a commission [to] bring in one of the best known". (Frédéric II (1846), p. 158, t.19on http://friedrich.uni-trier.de/fr/oeuvres/19/158/)) As early as 1761, Frederick II expressed his satisfaction with Noël, writing to the Marquis d'Argens that "Noël was able to satisfy the most gourmet epicurean in Europe". According to B. Maether, second head chef in 1767. In 1784, on the death of Joyard, he was appointed Joyard's successor as maître d'hôtel". Noël headed a team of twelve cooks (Note: According to his grandson Lucien Noël, his grandfather's team of cooks consisted not of twelve, but of twenty-four. According to other sources, the chief cook had under his command five royal cooks, eight master chefs, three bakers, seven pasty cooks, five butchers, two fish-keepers and one poultryman. (Schieder, Theodor; Scott, H.R.; Krause, Sabina (2016). Frederick the Great. Routledge. p. 88. ISBN 9781317901525.)) to provide royal service at the palace. When Frederick II invited a foreign guest to his table, André Noël could serve up to eighty dishes.

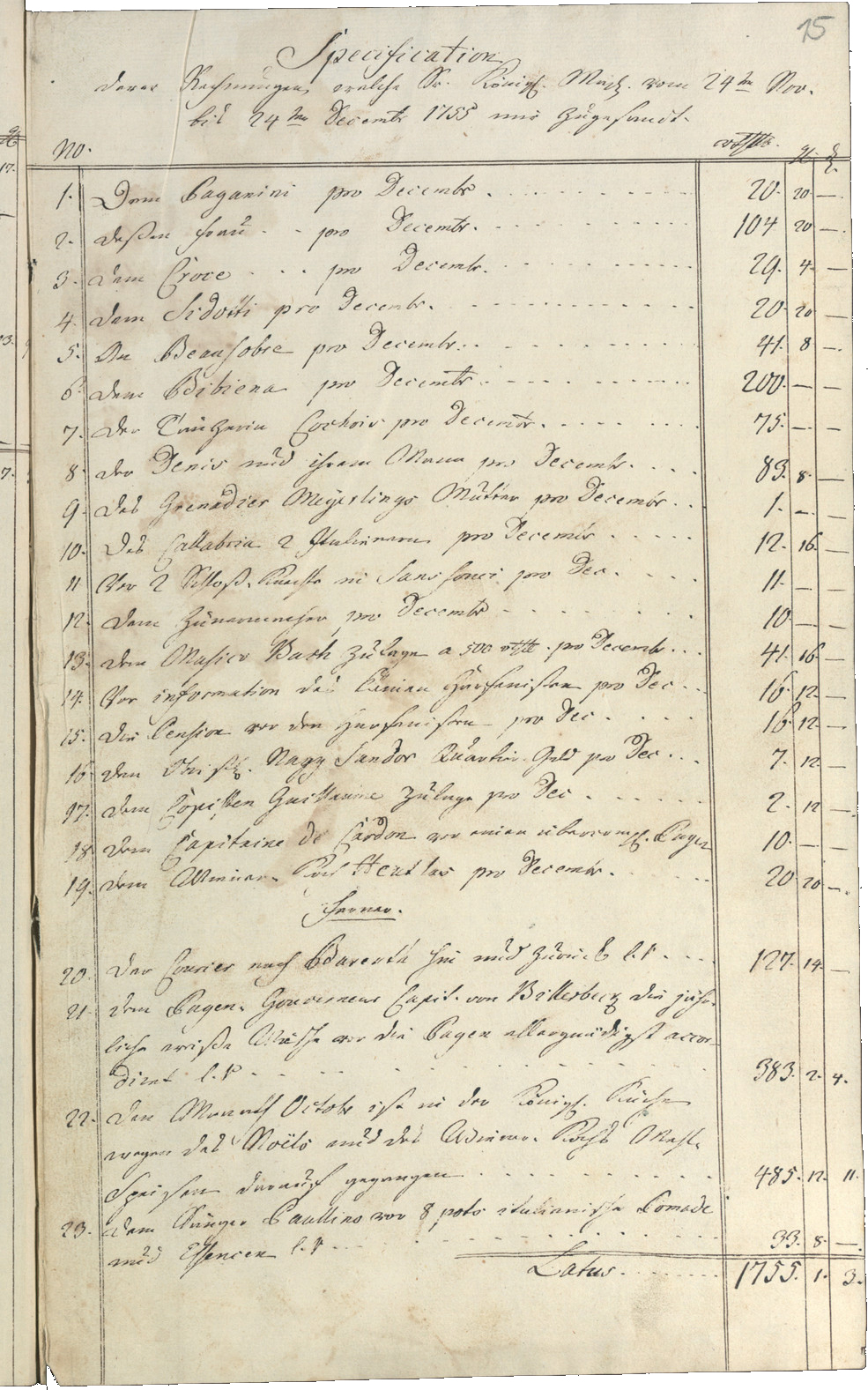
André Noël's emoluments in October 1755 (line 22): 485 thalers for "pastry" (Mehlspeisen).

The king's meals often gave rise to a ceremonial, with Frederick II composing verses to celebrate the occasion.

The great Noël [who] with his inventive hands,
Tonight surpasses his feats.

Jean-Charles Laveaux, who recounts these events, adds: "After declaiming these verses, the king flicked his wand, and dinner was served".

On September 9, 1786, Noël attended the funeral of Frederick II and took part in the procession. Until 1801, he remained the first master chef to his successor, Frederick William III. He died in Berlin on May 4, 1801, aged 75.

== Notable dishes ==
=== Bombe de Sardanapale ===
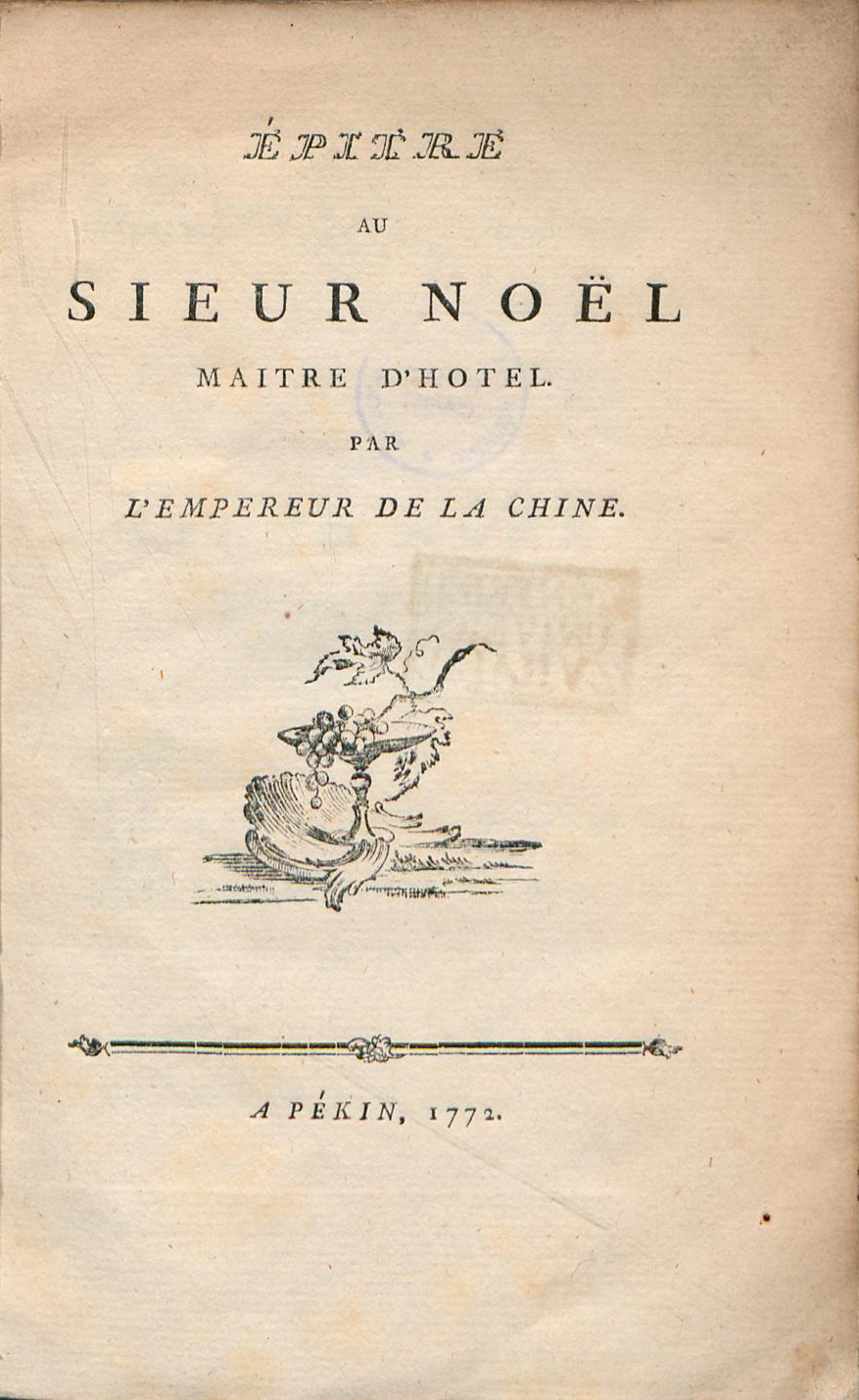
Title page of Frederick II's Epître au sieur Noël (1772).

According to Friedrich Nicolai, the "bombe de Sardanapale" (Note: Sardanapale was traditionally considered to have "surpassed all his predecessors in lust and laziness". (Saurin (1739). Discours historiques, critiques, théologiques, et moraux, sur les événemens les plus mémorables du Vieux, et du Nouveau Testament (in French). Sauzet. p. 10, t. 8.) Voltaire, however, wondered: "Was this Sardanapale a voluptuous idler or a philosopher hero? (Voltaire (1819). Philosophie (in French). Renouard. p. 341.)) was Frederick II's favorite dish which was frequently served at the royal table between 1772 and 1779. It is mentioned in a 137-verse poem by Frederick II, Epître au sieur Noël maître d'hôtel par l'Empereur de la Chine, published in Potsdam in 1772.

I'm not laughing; really, Mr. Noël,
Your great talents will make you immortal

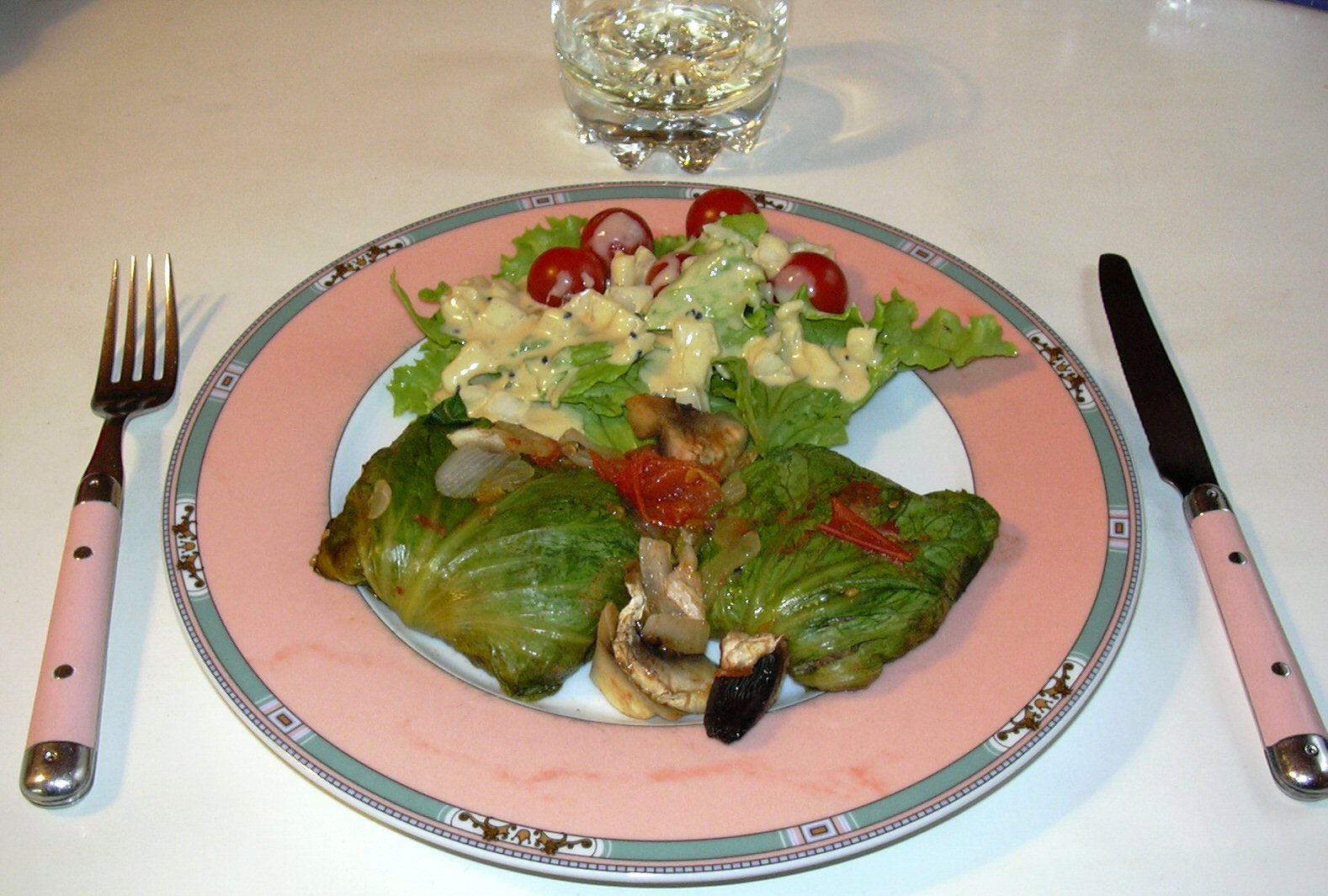
The "bombe de Sardanapale" is a variant of cabbage roll, a dish known throughout Europe, of which Allen Weiss counts over 77,000 variants, among which, according to this author, the most extravagant is Édouard Nignon's "marroné lyonnaise".

Sources differ as to the attribution of the recipe. For Jean-Robert Pitte, André Noël is the inventor. Heidi Driesner suggests that André Noël invented it, but that Frederick II chose the name of the dish. Pierre René Auguis proposes a third version: according to him, the king, tasting what Carlo Denina called "infernal cuisine", chose the ingredients, or rather demanded the incorporation of some, and Noël named the dish: (Note: In an epistle to his brother Henri, Frédéric II, referring to Boileau's Third Satire, (Frédéric II (1846), p. 5, t. 11at http://friedrich.uni-trier.de/fr/oeuvres/11/5/) evokes a maître d'hôtel (Frédéric II (1846), p. 147, t. 9at http://friedrich.uni-trier.de/fr/volz/9/147/) who "from the kitchen to the palace drawing room / Leads with great pomp a Luculle supper; / The slightest dish, it is he who entitles it / With a baroque and very mismatched name".(Frédéric II (1846), p. 5, t. 11at http://friedrich.uni-trier.de/fr/oeuvres/11/5/))

He imagined a combination of ingredients so violent as to outrage any other man: Noël protested against such an unhealthy dish, but obeyed repeated orders. The King, delighted with his cooking, spoke up and said: Noël, I have had the glory of creating a delicious dish, and I leave you the honor of naming it. At first, the maître d'hôtel apologized, but then, in a hurry, he replied brusquely: "Call it bombe à la sardanapale". The King laughed and said to the Count of Schullenbourg: "It's out of affection for me that he's getting angry!".

According to Friedrich Nicolai, the "bombe de Sardanapale" is a head of cabbage or savoy cabbage, stuffed with spicy meat, olives, capers, anchovies and "other fine ingredients", "cooked or roasted with particular care". Lucien Noël also names bacon, garlic and saffron among the ingredients. Friedrich Nicolai reports having seen the king annotate his "bombe" menus with a "bravo Noël!" on several occasions, and adds that the king ate so much of it that he developed indigestion. The same Nicolai assures that he asked Noël for his recipe and tried to reproduce the dish in his own kitchen, but never succeeded, despite "weeks of preparation and instruction from the cook".

However, a contemporary attempt was made to reproduce the famous recipe on the occasion of the tercentenary of the birth of Frederick II.

=== Pâté du Périgord de Magdebourg ===
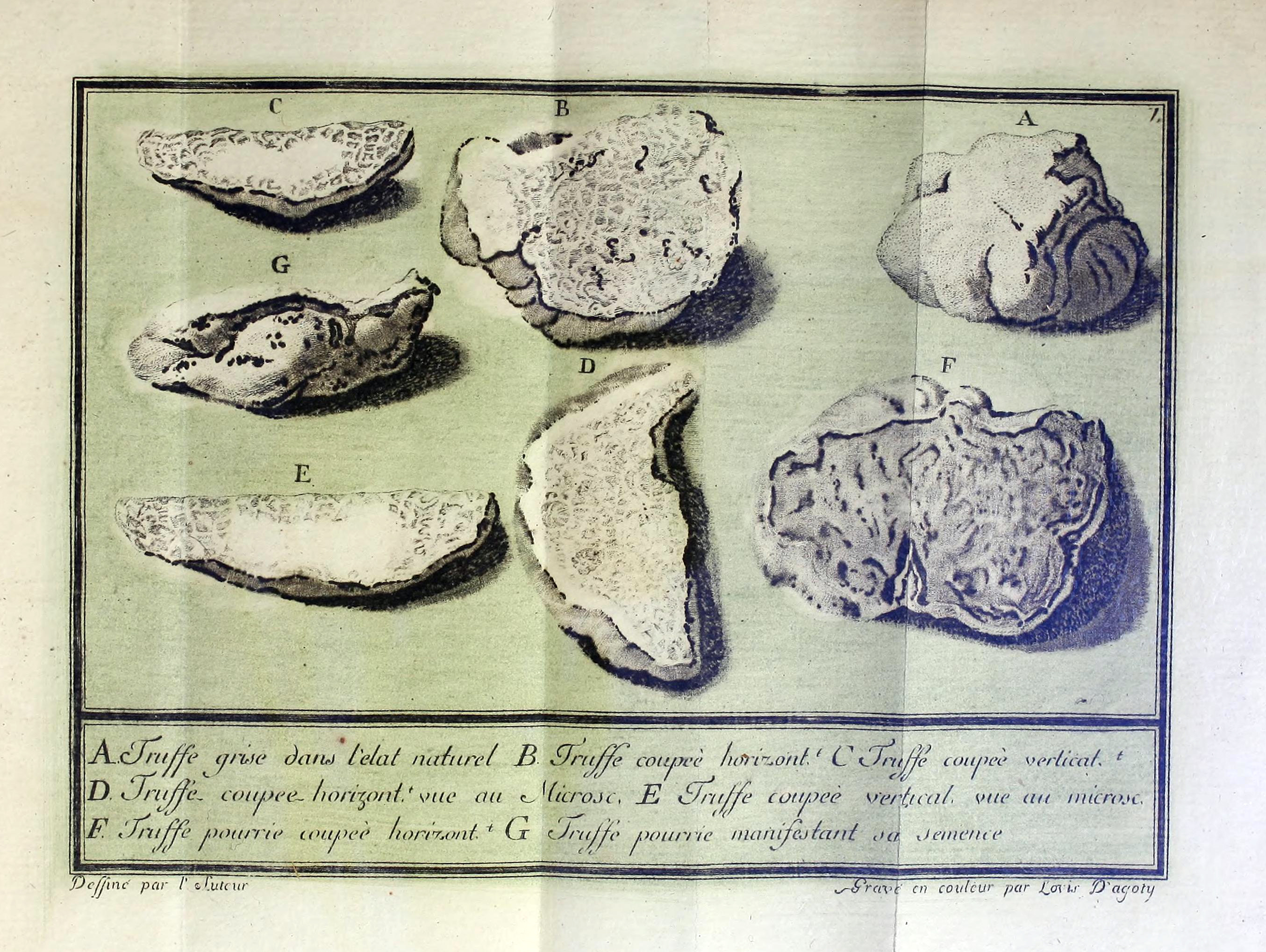
Piedmont truffles by Michel-Jean Borch (it) (1780). Italian truffles were a favorite of Frederick II.

Aware of the king's predilection for truffles, Baron de La Motte Fouqué sent for some dogs from Croatia, trained to find them. Truffles were found in the vicinity of Magdeburg, and Fouqué had a pâté prepared and sent to the king. Noël was then commissioned to make a "pâté du Périgord de Magdebourg" with these truffles, which he did.

=== Arrière-faix de Marie-Antoinette ===
In his Memoirs, Charles of Hesse-Kassel wrote about André Noël, whom he met in 1779. He notes that Frederick II's cook prepared "admirable" soups, dishes "mostly in the French style and some of extraordinary strength", made with "all sorts of extremely delicate things". Among the dishes served to him, in addition to "bombe de Sardanapale", he cites a dish called "arrière-faix de Marie-Antoinette", which he describes as a "very curiously prepared stew".

=== Roulette ===
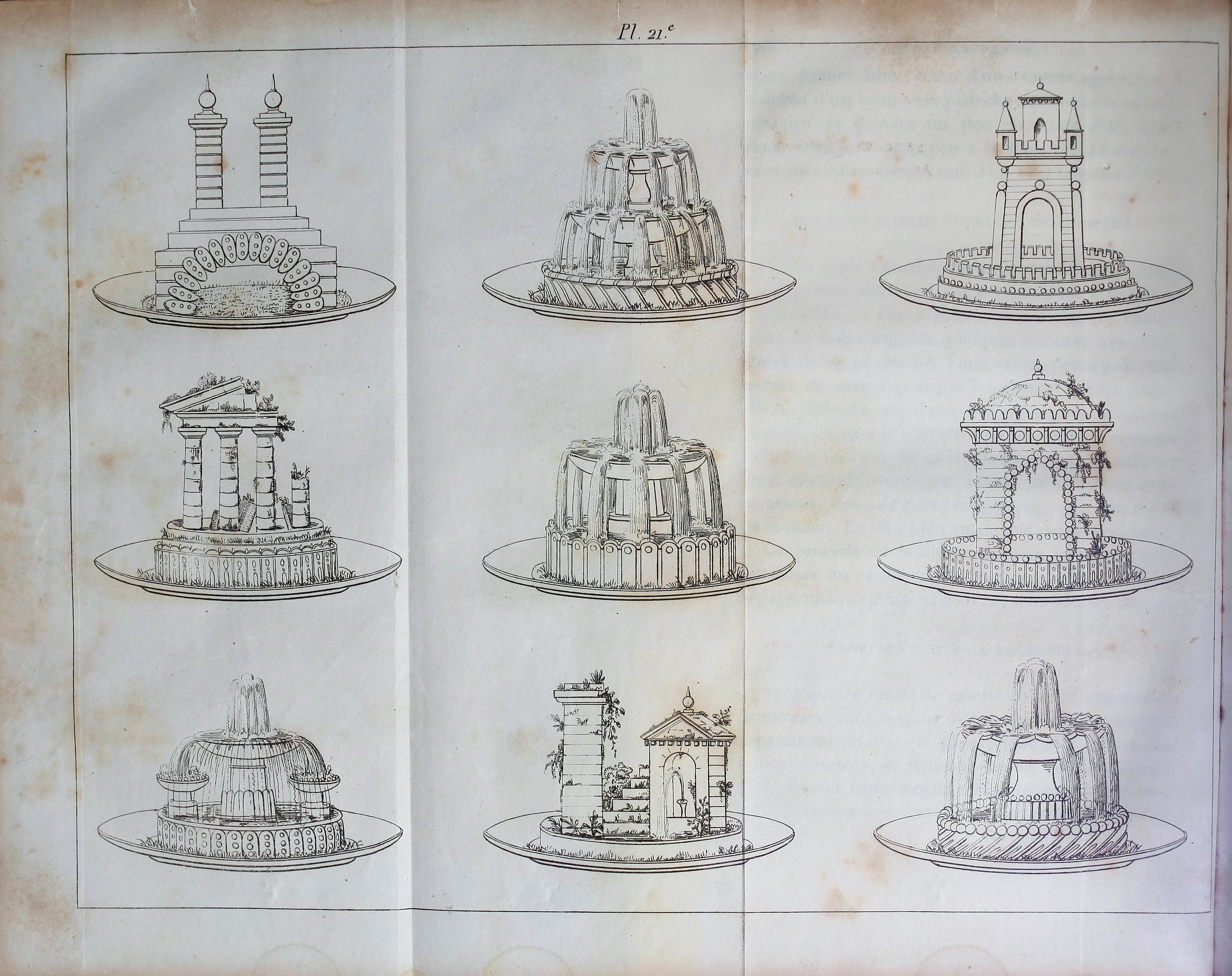
Entremets aux pommes de Carême (1842).

Although no pastry recipe is specifically attributed to André Noël, as fruit played an important role at Frederick II's table, he was fond of pastries. Pierre Lacam and Antoine Charabot credit André Noël with the invention of the pastry wheel: Wanting to make a frangipane tart without "banding it as usual", (Note: Banding a tart means topping it with strips of pasta. (Le Grand Vocabulaire françois. Panckoucke. 1768. p. 445.)) he took "a scrap spur from the stables" and made "fluted strips to toast it on and around". The king was pleased, and Noël had "an ironmonger make [...] a roulette wheel fluted on both sides with a handle". This, they say, "toured Germany and Austria", before being adopted in France by the great pastry chef Carême. (Note: Carême, for his part, refers to a "round fluted pastry cutter"(Carême, Marie-Antoine (1815). Le Pâtissier royal parisien ou Traité élémentaire et pratique de la pâtisserie ancienne et moderne (in French). Dentu. p. 66.), also mentioned by Leblanc (Leblanc (1834). Manuel du pâtissier (in French). Librairie encyclopédique de Roret. p. 15.) and distinguished by the latter from the videlle, whose existence had been attested since 1694. (Corneille, Thomas (1694). Le Dictionnaire des arts et des sciences (in French). p. 569, t. 4.))

=== Debated attributions ===
==== Pâté de La Mettrie ====
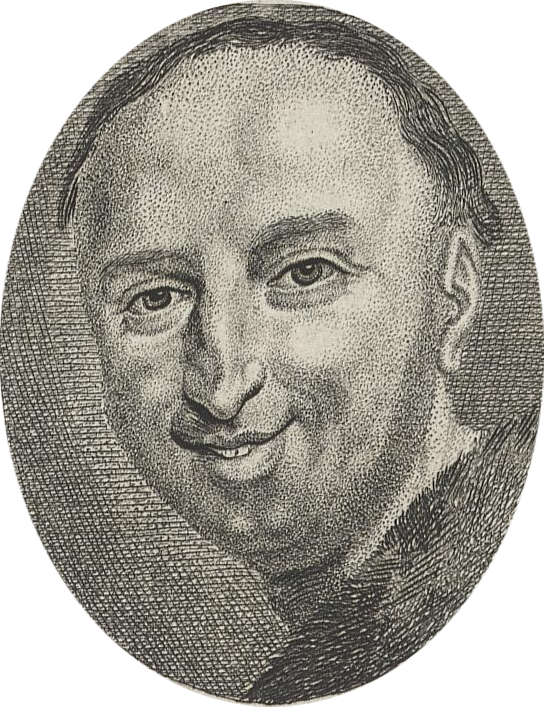
La Mettrie by Lavater, in 1741, ten years before the disastrous pâté.

Casanova reports that

Without Noël [...] or rather without the skill of this culinary artist, the famous Lamettrie, that atheist doctor, would not have died of indigestion; for the pâté he ate to excess at Lord Tyrconel's [Richard-François Talbot, comte de Tyrconnel, French ambassador to the Prussian court] had been made by Noël.

In his edition of Casanova's Memoirs, Raoul Vèze gives a variant of this passage in another state of the manuscript: the dish responsible for Lamettrie's death could, according to Casanova, have been "bombe de Sardanapale", a conjecture the editor also attributes to Lord Dover. Although other authors credit Lord Rover with this assertion, he reported that La Mettrie died of indigestion after eating a truffle pâté. Friedrich Wilhelm Barthold, one of the first to refer to La Mettrie's death as a "bombe de Sardanapale", adds, however, that only Casanova seems to have known that Noël was the cook of the dish.

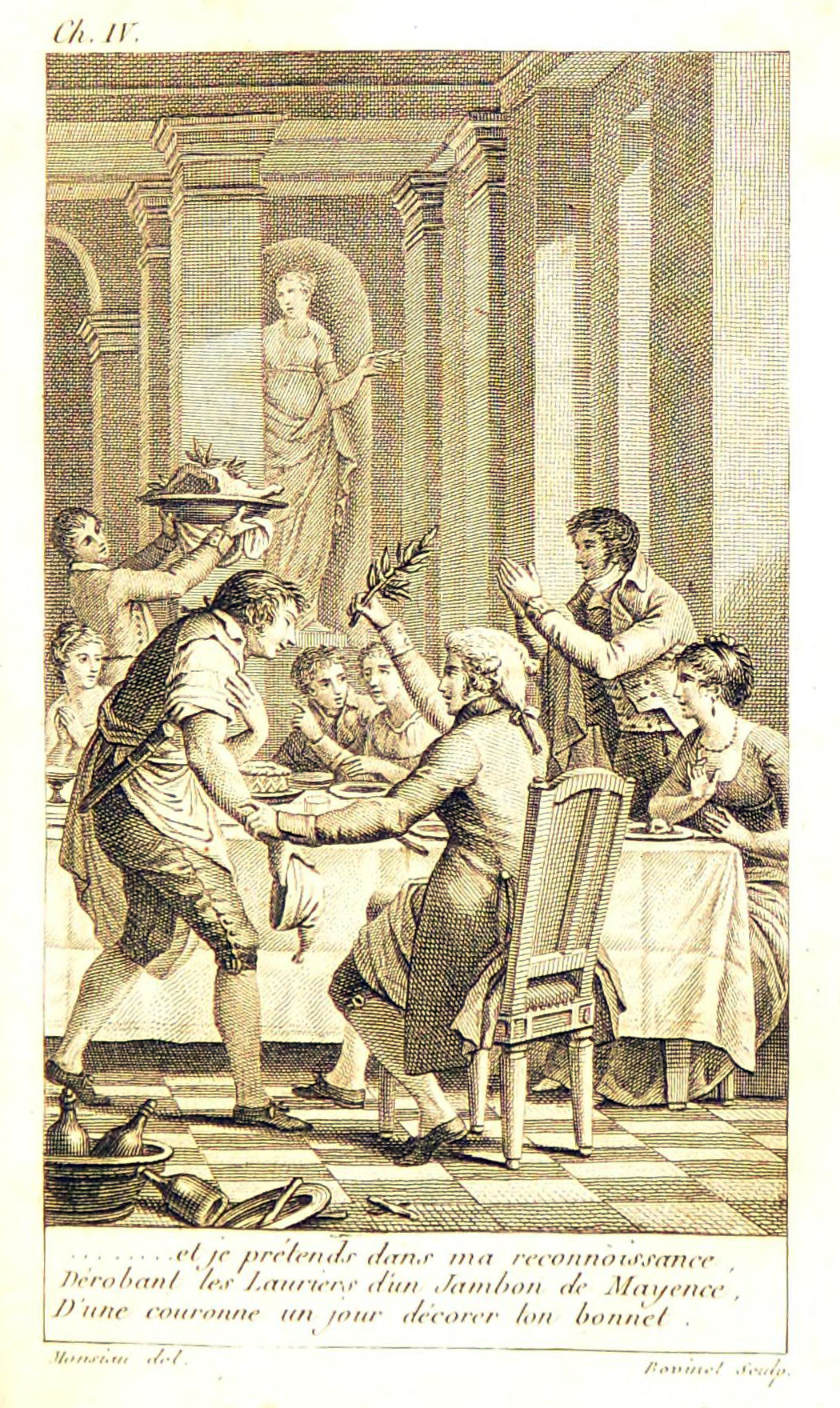
Illustration by Monsiau for La Gastronomie, by Joseph Berchoux: André Noël congratulated by the king.

This is an anachronism on Casanova's part: It was in 1751, before Noël arrived in Potsdam, and not in 1764, that La Mettrie died of having eaten a pâté that Madeleine Ferrières wondered was from Périgueux, Antoine Louis Paris asserted that it was made by "a cook who passed for very skilful" who had arrived from Paris, Voltaire, that it was "sent from the North", Frederick II, that it was "a whole pheasant pâté", and Voltaire, again, that the ginger masked the presence of spoiled meat.

=== Menus ===
Frederick II's meal menu generally consisted of eight courses, (Note: See above, however, the testimony of Charles of Hesse-Kassel.) four of which were French-inspired, two Italian-inspired and two other ones. Vehse gives the menu for one of his last meals, arranged with Noël on August 5, 1786, twelve days before his death, where the king signified his approval of the dish with a cross (†):

Dinner - His Majesty's Table
Cook	Dish	Comment
Henault	Cabbage soup à la Fouqué	†
Pfund	Beef with parsnips and carrots	†
Voigt	Cannelon chicken with cucumbers stuffed with white wine à l'anglaise	Scratched and replaced by chops in paper
Dionisius	Roman-style pies	
Dionisius	Young roasted pigeons	
Pfund	Dessau style salmon	†
Blesson (Note: French chef Nicolas Blesson is also known from a pastel painted three years later by his sister-in-law, Henriette-Félicité Tassaert. (Leclerc, Guy; Wernicke, Kurt (2009). " Félicité Henriette Robert geboren Tassaert " dans Berlin in Geschichte und Gegenwart (in German). Gebr. Mann Verlag. p. 93.))	Pompadour-style chicken fillets with beef tongue and croquets	
Dionisius	Portuguese cake	Scratched and replaced by waffles
Pfund	Peas	†
Pfund	Fresh herring	†
Pfund	Marinated cucumbers	

== Posterity ==
On March 12, 1804, an actor played André Noël at a Berlin masked ball in honor of Queen Louise:

The spirit of the late Noël, Frederick II's famous cook, appeared. Not to depart from his eternal habit, he didn't appear without his umbrella, from which, to characterize the spirit, a light crêpe dangled. He confessed that one of the principal organs of a good cook, the nose, had brought him out of the underworld, and apostrophized the company with these words: The smell of pheasants and truffles draws me from Paradise. I've come to offer my most humble services for this evening, because there are no good feasts without old Noël. (Note: As Raoul Vèze recalls, the appearance of Noël greatly struck his contemporaries. His curious appearance," he says, "aroused attention everywhere. "He had retained the costume fashionable in Paris at the time of Louis XIV, and never appeared without a hand-width gold braid on each piece of his clothing. An enormous hammered wig adorned his head, as did a richly trimmed tricorne)

André Noël is one of the characters in the historical novel Potsdam und Sans-Souci (1848), written by Eduard Maria Oettinger. In this novel, set in 1750 at the Château de Sans-Souci, Noël - who goes by the name Jacques Narcisse - reads Le Comte de Gabalis and frequents Voltaire and La Mettrie.

== Bibliography ==
- Berchoux, Joseph (1803). La Gastronomie, poëme (in French). Giguet et Michaud.
- Casanova, Giacomo; Vèze, Raoul (1931). Mémoires (in French). Paris: La Sirène.
- Frédéric II (1846). Œuvres de Frédéric le Grand (in French). Johann David Erdmann Preuß.
- Laveaux, Jean-Charles (1789). Vie de Frédéric II, roi de Prusse, accompagnée de remarques, pièces justificatives et d'un grand nombre d'anecdotes dont la plupart n'ont point encore été publiées (in French). Treuttel.
- Thiébault, Dieudonné (1804). Mes souvenirs de vingt ans de séjour à Berlin, ou Frédéric le Grand : sa famille, sa cour, son gouvernement, son académie, ses écoles, et ses amis littérateurs et philosophes (in French). Paris: Buisson.
