= Karl Gutknecht =

19th-century German-Swiss printer, publisher and publicist

- Born: 1811; Nuremberg, Bavaria
- Died: November 8, 1873; Bern, Switzerland
- Occupations: Printer, Publisher, Publicist
- Known for: Editor of Neues Schweizerisches Unterhaltungsblatt, Publisher of works by Jeremias Gotthelf
- Spouse: Unknown
- Children: One daughter

Karl Gutknecht (1811 – 8 November 1873) was a Bavarian-born Swiss printer, publisher and publicist who operated a printing press in Bern. He is best known as the editor and publisher of the literary magazine Neues Schweizerisches Unterhaltungsblatt and for publishing several works by the Swiss author Jeremias Gotthelf.

== Biography ==
Nothing is known about Gutknecht's origins, childhood, or youth. Born in Nuremberg in 1811, he remained a Bavarian subject throughout his life. The name of his wife, with whom he had a daughter, is also unknown. Gutknecht rose through all the ranks of his profession, from typesetter to owner of a printing business.

=== Early publications ===
Gutknecht initially tried his luck with several publications, sometimes signing them with the pseudonym Karl Gutmann. Among these early ventures, the magazine Die Kinderzeitung had a short lifespan. Published in Bern from 1841 to 1842, it featured contributions from Albert Bitzius, who wrote under the pseudonym Jeremias Gotthelf, including a preface in 1841 and the story Geraldine, die gebesserte Tochter in 1842. Similarly, the periodical Malerischer Jugendfreund, printed in Bern, only appeared during 1843.

=== Business establishment ===
In 1848, Gutknecht founded a printing and publishing house at Metzgergasse 91 in Bern, together with Johann Samuel Albrecht Simmen and two other partners. From 1850 onwards, he managed the business alone.

=== Neues Schweizerisches Unterhaltungsblatt ===
Between 1843 and 1871, Gutknecht served as editor and publisher of the literary magazine Neues Schweizerisches Unterhaltungsblatt. The publication featured three stories by Gotthelf: Elsi, l'étrange servante (1843), Kurt de Koppigen (1844), and Christens Brautfahrt (1845). Other Swiss authors also published in the magazine, including Johann Jakob Reithard, Josef Jakob Xaver Pfyffer zu Neueck (who appeared as co-editors on the title page for advertising purposes in 1843), Arthur Bitter, Ludwig Eckardt, Alfred Hartmann, and Thomas Bornhauser.

Gutknecht also recruited German and Austrian writers for his magazine, including Eduard Maria Oettinger, Joseph Rank, Friedrich Gerstäcker, Fanny Lewald, Adalbert Stifter, and Theodor Fontane. He also featured a number of authors of village stories, such as Karl Arnold Schlönbach, Ernst Willkomm, and W.O. von Horn (pseudonym of Friedrich Wilhelm Philipp Oertel). A desired co-editorship with Bitzius, Reithard, and Pfyffer zu Neueck never materialized, as Bitzius did not appreciate the literary quality of the Unterhaltungsblatt.

=== Newspaper publishing ===
From 1855, Gutknecht published the radical newspaper Berner Zeitung, serving as its editor-in-chief from 1857 until its merger with the Berner Tagespost in 1872. In the same year, he sold his business to the Bernese publishing house A. Lang, Blau & Co.
