= Ehrensvärd =

Ehrensvärd is the name of a Swedish noble family and may refer to:

- Johan Jacob Ehrensvärd (1666–1731), Swedish colonel
  - Augustin Ehrensvärd (1710–1772), Swedish military architect, a lieutenant colonel in the artillery
    - Carl August Ehrensvärd (1745–1800), Swedish naval officer, painter, author, and neo-classical architect
  - Carl Ehrensvärd (1713–1770), Swedish politician
    - Gustaf Johan Ehrensvärd (1746–1783), Swedish writer. Brother of Carl August Ehrensvärd and half brother to Carl Fredrik Ehrensvärd
    - Carl August Ehrensvärd (1749–1805), Swedish general and diplomat
    - Carl Fredrik Ehrensvärd (1767–1815), Swedish Freiherr, convicted of involvement in the murder of Gustav III in 1792 and sentenced to death. Married to Thomasine Christine Gyllembourg-Ehrensvärd (1773–1856), Danish author, born in Copenhagen.
- Gustaf Karl Albert August Ehrensvärd (1787–1860), Swedish colonel
  - Albert Ehrensvärd (1821–1901), Swedish politician
    - Albert Ehrensvärd (1867–1940), Swedish diplomat
    - Carl August Ehrensvärd (1858–1944), Swedish admiral, politician and sea minister 1907–1911
      - Gösta Ehrensvärd (1885–1973), Swedish admiral
        - Gösta Ehrensvärd (1910–1980), Swedish chemist
      - Augustin Ehrensvärd (1887–1968), Swedish civil servant
      - Carl August Ehrensvärd (1892–1974), Swedish general
