= Vestergade 7 =

Vestergade 7 may refer to:

- Vestergade 7, Copenhagen, a heritage listed building in Copenhagen
- Vestergade 7, Køge, a heritage listed building in Køge
