= Peter Andreas Heiberg =

Danish-Norwegian author and philologist

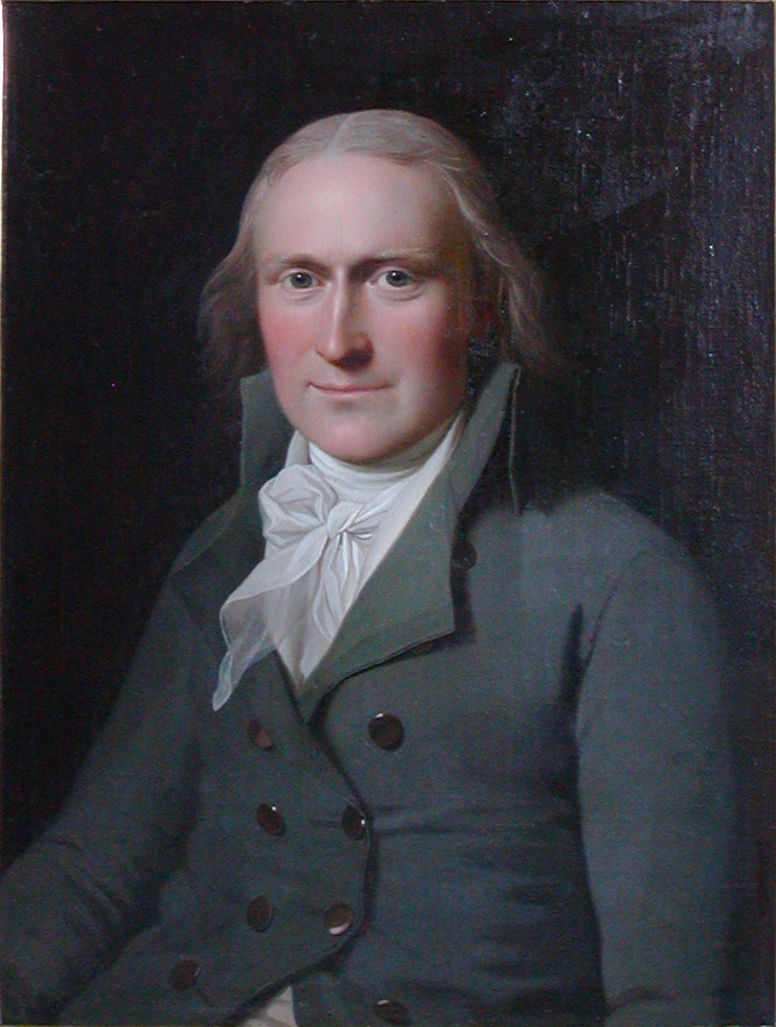
Peter Andreas Heiberg painted by Jens Juel.

Peter Andreas Heiberg (16 November 1758 – 30 April 1841) was a Danish-Norwegian author and philologist. He was born in Vordingborg, Denmark-Norway. The Heiberg ancestry can be traced back to Norway, and has produced a long line of priests, headmasters and other learned men. His father was the Norwegian-born headteacher of the grammar school in Vordingborg, Ludvig Heiberg, whilst his mother was Inger Margrethe, daughter of the vicar at the manor of Vemmetofte Peder Heiberg, a relative of Ludvig Heiberg, and Inger Hørning, who came from a family of wealthy Danish merchants.

== Biography ==
His father died when Heiberg was just two years old, and his mother moved with the children to live with her father at Vemmetofte near the town of Faxe in Zealand. This was to be Heiberg's home until he went to grammar school, from which he graduated in 1774. In 1777 he took the greater philological exam, and in 1779 he left Copenhagen, presumably due to gambling debts. He then went to Sweden to join the Swedish military forces. One and a half years later, his family bought him out of his military service, and after a short stay in Uppsala, he went to Bergen, where he stayed with his uncle for three years. In Bergen Heiberg met several writers who inspired him to start writing himself. After his return to Copenhagen, he used his linguistic skills to get a job as an interpreter. Heiberg also translated a publication by the French writer Jean-Charles Laveaux, which was highly critical towards the upper class. This was likely the reason why Heiberg chose to publish the translated version anonymously. In 1790, Heiberg married the 16-year-old Thomasine Buntzen with whom he had the son Johan Ludvig.

Many of Heiberg's role models were French and usually marked by the ideals of the Enlightenment.

His début novel Rigsdalersedlens Hændelser (1789) critically describes merchants, the nobility and the German influence on Denmark. This novel highly angered the Danish upper class, but Heiberg kept writing similarly critical songs, articles, essays and plays (one play, Heckingborn, being translated into English in 1799 with the title Poverty and Wealth). This political criticism led to Heiberg being banished on Christmas Eve, 1799. He had previously been given many warnings and fines for his works full of criticism of the government, but after new, harsher censorship laws were introduced by the crown prince Frederick in September 1799 he was accused and sentenced retroactively to banishment. Thereafter, Heiberg settled in Paris where he lived until his death in 1841.

== Selected works ==
- Indtogsvise (1790)
- Rigdsdaler-Sedlens haendelser (1787–93)
- Sprog-Grandskning (1798)
- De vonner og vanner (1793)
