= Vestergade 7, Copenhagen =

Historic building in Copenhagen, Denmark

Vestergade 7
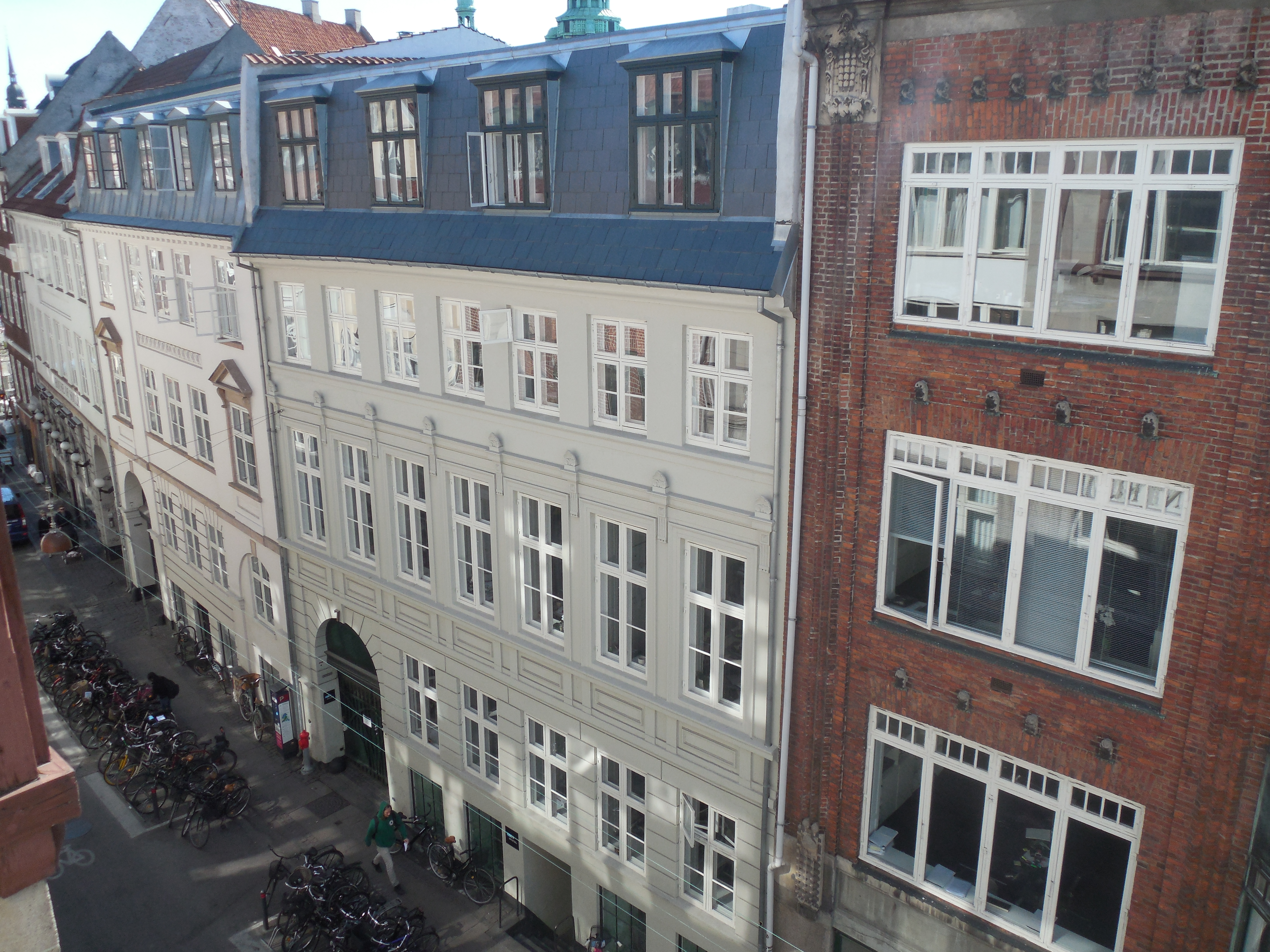
- Interactive map of the Vestergade 7 area

General information
- Location: Copenhagen, Denmark
- Coordinates: 55°40′40.26″N 12°34′15.02″E
- Completed: 1798
- Renovated: 1875 /rear wing)
- Client: Danish Union of Teachers

Vestergade 7 is a Neoclassical building complex situated close to Gammeltorv in the Old Town of Copenhagen, Denmark. It was constructed for royal building inspector Andreas Kirkerup as part of the building of the city following the Copenhagen Fire of 1795. The property was listed on the Danish registry of protected buildings and places in 1991. Notable former residents include the master builder Johan Boye Junge and archeologist Peter Oluf Brøndsted. The Danish Institute for Study Abroad (DIA) is now based in the building. The adjacent building at Vestergade 5 is also owned by the Danish Institute for Study Abroad.

== History ==
=== 18th century ===
The building is located on the site where Copenhagen's Medieval fortifications were located. In 1806–07, Ramsing found the remains of a moat ("Møllerenden") at Vestergade 9–11. In 1987, excavations in the basement of Vestergade 7 found the remains of a moat. The oldest buildings on the site were constructed in the 13th century.

The site was formerly made up of two smaller properties. One of the two properties were listed in Copenhagen's first cadastre of 1689 as No. 124, owned by butcher Torkild Andersen. The property was after his death passed to his relative Ole Hansen (butcher). On his death, it was sold at auction to his widow Else Hansdatter (deed issued 24 October 1712). It belonged to joiner Michel Falck. The other property was listed in the Cadastre of 1689 as No. 224, owned by Lars Nielsen.

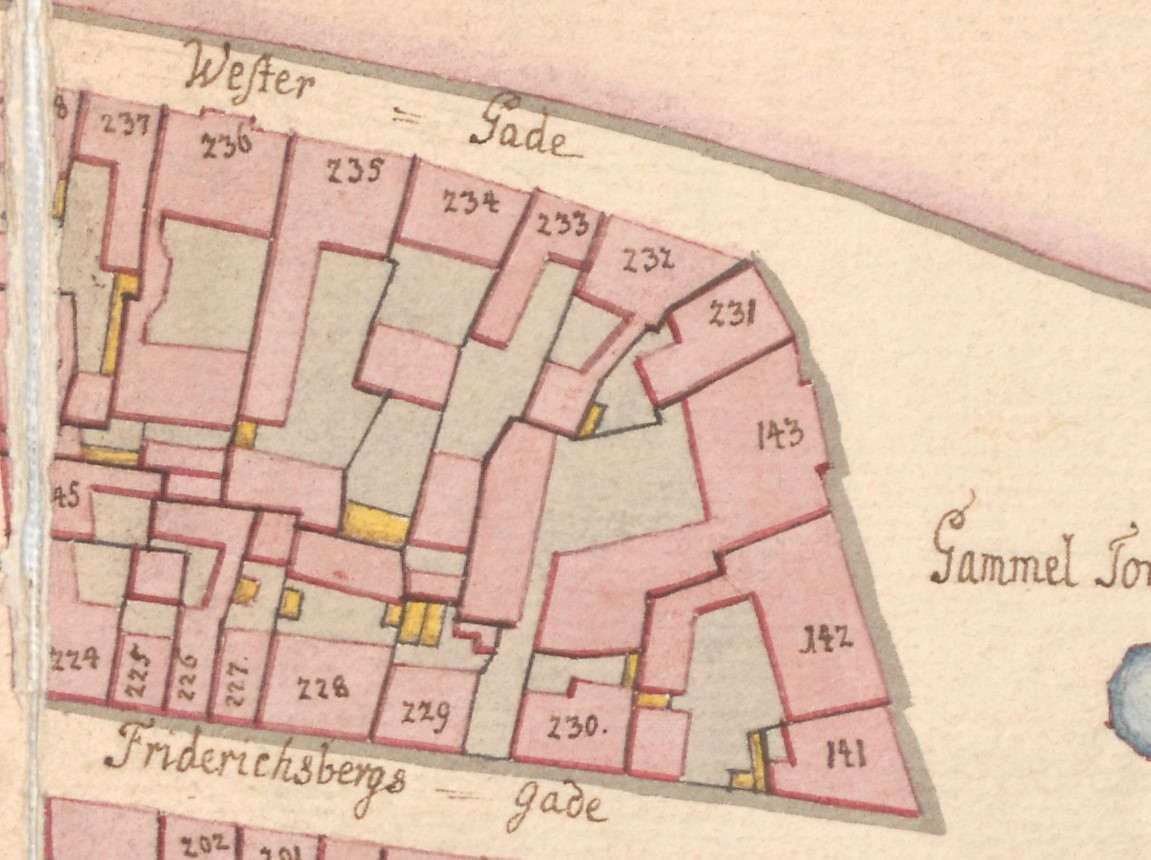
No. 234 seen on a detail from Christian Gedde's map of Copenhagen's West Quarter, 1757.

The buildings on the site were destroyed in the Copenhagen Fire of 1728, together with the nearby City Hall and most of the other buildings in the area. After the fire, the two fire sites were merged into a single property. It was listed in the new cadastre of 1756 as No. 235 in Western Quarter, owned by wine seller (vintapper) Christian Lindemand.

=== Peder Johannes Friedenreich and the new building ===
The building was destroyed in the Copenhagen Fire of 1795, together with the new city hall and most of the other buildings in the area. The present building on the site was constructed in 1798 to designs by Andreas Kirkerup.

The property was either before or fairly shortly after its completion sold to wine merchant Peder Johannes Friedenreich . His property was home to 22 residents in two households at the 1801 census. The owner resided in the building with his wife Ane Cathrine Ortholm, their two children (aged one and three), a wine merchant (employee), a wine merchant's apprentice, a caretaker, a female cook and a maid. Isaak Samuel Benners, a plantation owner, resided in the building with his wife Marie Christine Appelbye, their five children (aged two to nine), a female tutor (Francoise), a female cook, a maid, a nanny, a male servant and a caretaker.

Peder Johannes Friedenreich's property was listed in the new cadastre of 1806 as No. 42 in Western Quarter.

Johan Boye Junge (1735-1807), a master builder and chief of the Civilian Infantry Corps, resided in the building until his death in 1807. Johan Christian Schønheider (1744-1831), a medical doctor, writer and translator, was also among the residents around 1807. Peter Oluf Brøndsted (1780-1842)m an archeologist, resided in one of the apartments in 1833–34.

Friederich's property was home to 22 residents in two households in two households at the 1840 census.Peder Johannes Friedenreich and Ane Ortholm resided on the ground floor and second floor with their five children (aged 26 to 39), Friedenreich's susters Caroline and Ingeborg, 32-year-old Margrethe Krøyer (teacher), an apprentice, a male servant, a maid and a lodger. Peter Bentsen, an official from the Royal Greenland Yrading Department with title of justitsråd, resided on the first floor with his wife Pauline Cecilie Bentsen (née Smith), their four children (aged 19 to 24) and two maids.

=== 1850 census ===
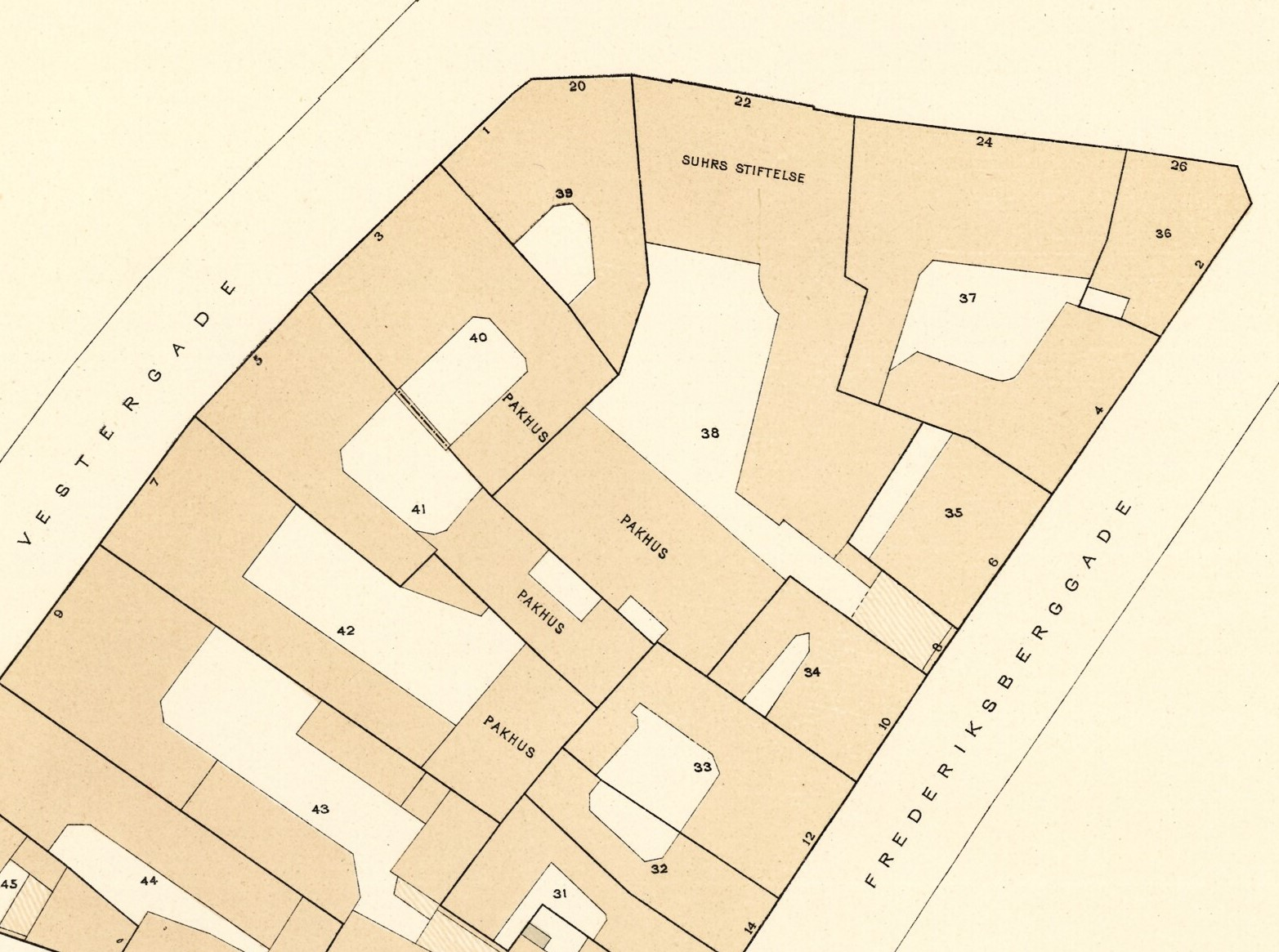
Vesterhade 7 seen on a detail from one of Berggreen's block plans of Western Quarter, 1886-88.

The property was again home to 23 residents in three households at the 1850 census. Henrik Carl Christian Johansen, a new wine merchant, resided on the ground floor with his wife Johanne W.C. Johansen, two apprentices, two male servants and one maid. Jens Emil Damkie, a lawyer and politician, resided in the building with his wife Augusta Christiane Damkier, their five children (aged one to eight), one male servant and two maids. Dilev Recke, an artillery captain, resided in the building with his wife Eliza Recke, their infant son, a maid and a female cook.

=== 1860 census ===
At the 1860 census, No. 42 was home to two households. Johanne Wilhelmine Christine Johansen (née Solling), a retailer, resided in the building with her three children (aged four to 10), two retailers (employees), two maids and a caretaker. Aurelia Dorothea Schmidten født Møller, a widow chamber maid, resided in the building with her Sophie Cathrine Møller, a husjomfru and two maids.

=== Later history ===
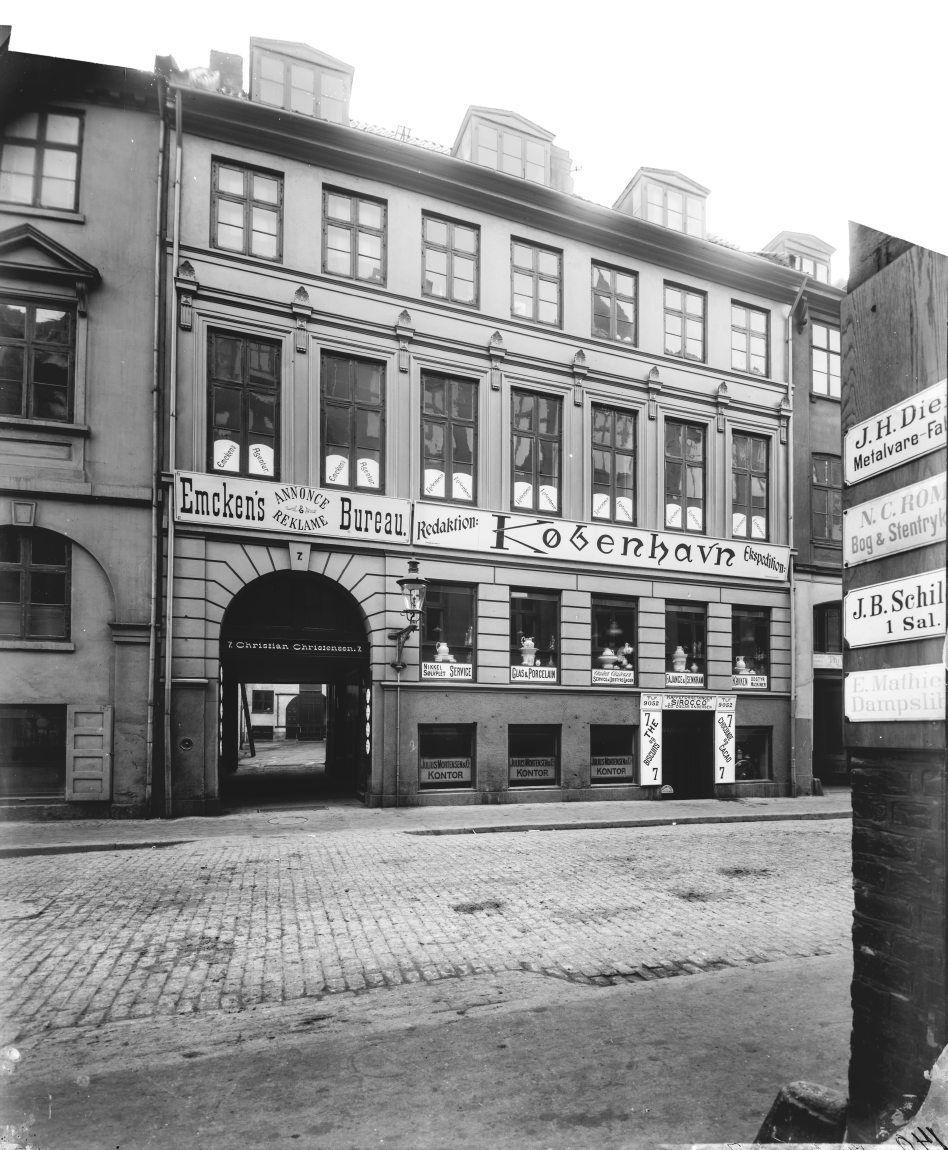
The building photographed by Johannes Hauerslev.

The warehouse in the courtyard was heightened in 1985.

Around the turn of the century, the newspaper København, which was founded by Ove Rode in 1889, was based in the building. Other tenants in the building complex around that time included Encken's Bureau, an adverting agency, and Osvar Andersen's coffee shop Sirocco.

The building was owned by wholesale merchant (grosserer) Hans Christian Christensen (1864-) in 1908. He also owned Gammel Strand 38.

In January 1987 plans were presented to turn Vestergade 5–7 into a hotel. The floor of the basement was the same year lowered.

== Architect ==
Vestergade 7 is a three-winged complex constructed with three storeys over a walk-out basement. The seven-bay-wide, plastered facade is finished with shadow joints on the ground floor and many decorative details on the upper floors. A two-bay gateway is located furthest to the left. The Mansard roof features five dormer windows towards the street. A very long side wing extends from the rear side of the building along the southwest side of a narrow, central courtyard. The side wing is attached to a warehouse at the far end of the courtyard. The facade of the warehouse is crowned by a gabled wall deformer.

== Gallery ==
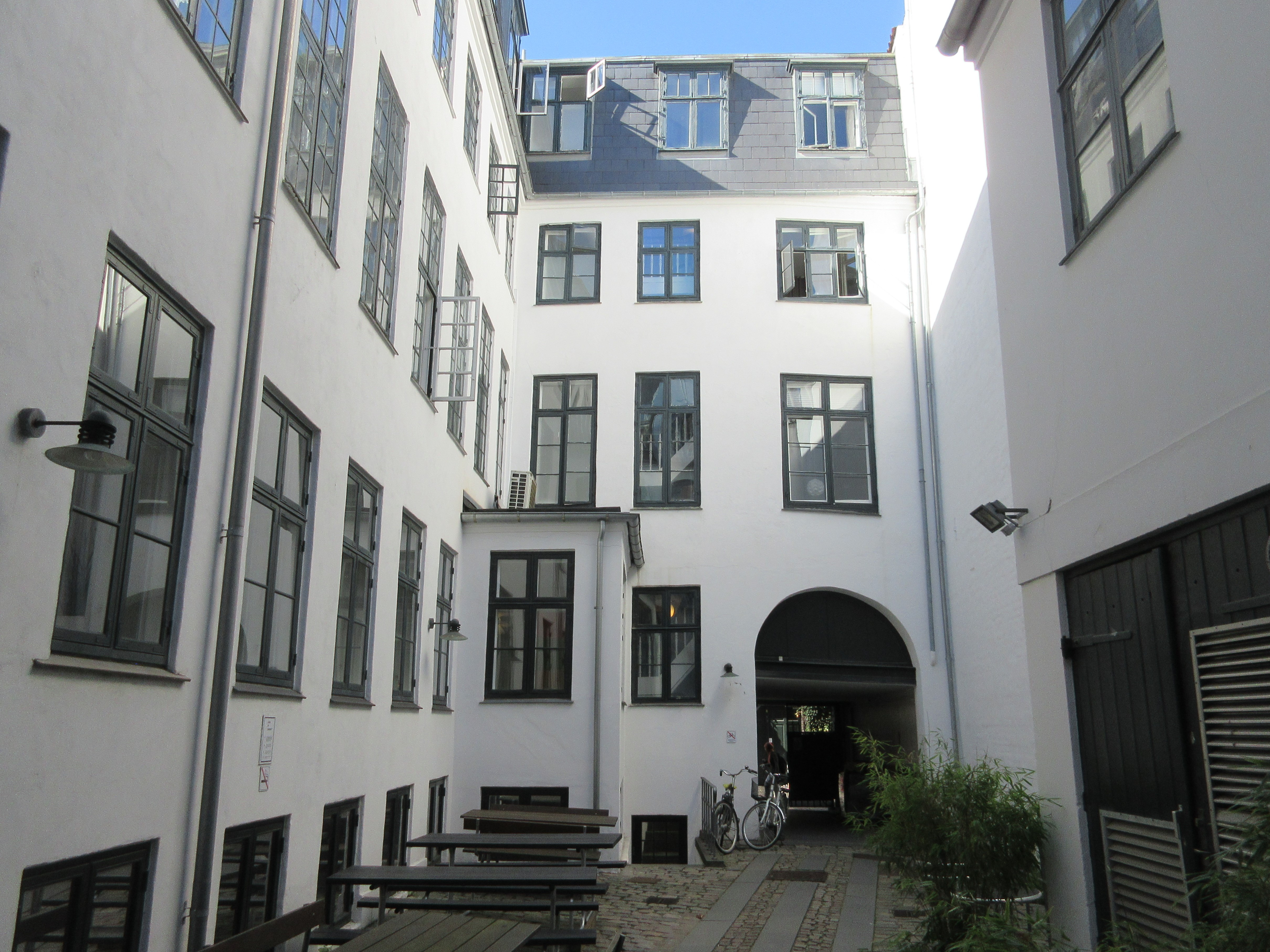
The front wing seen from the yard-

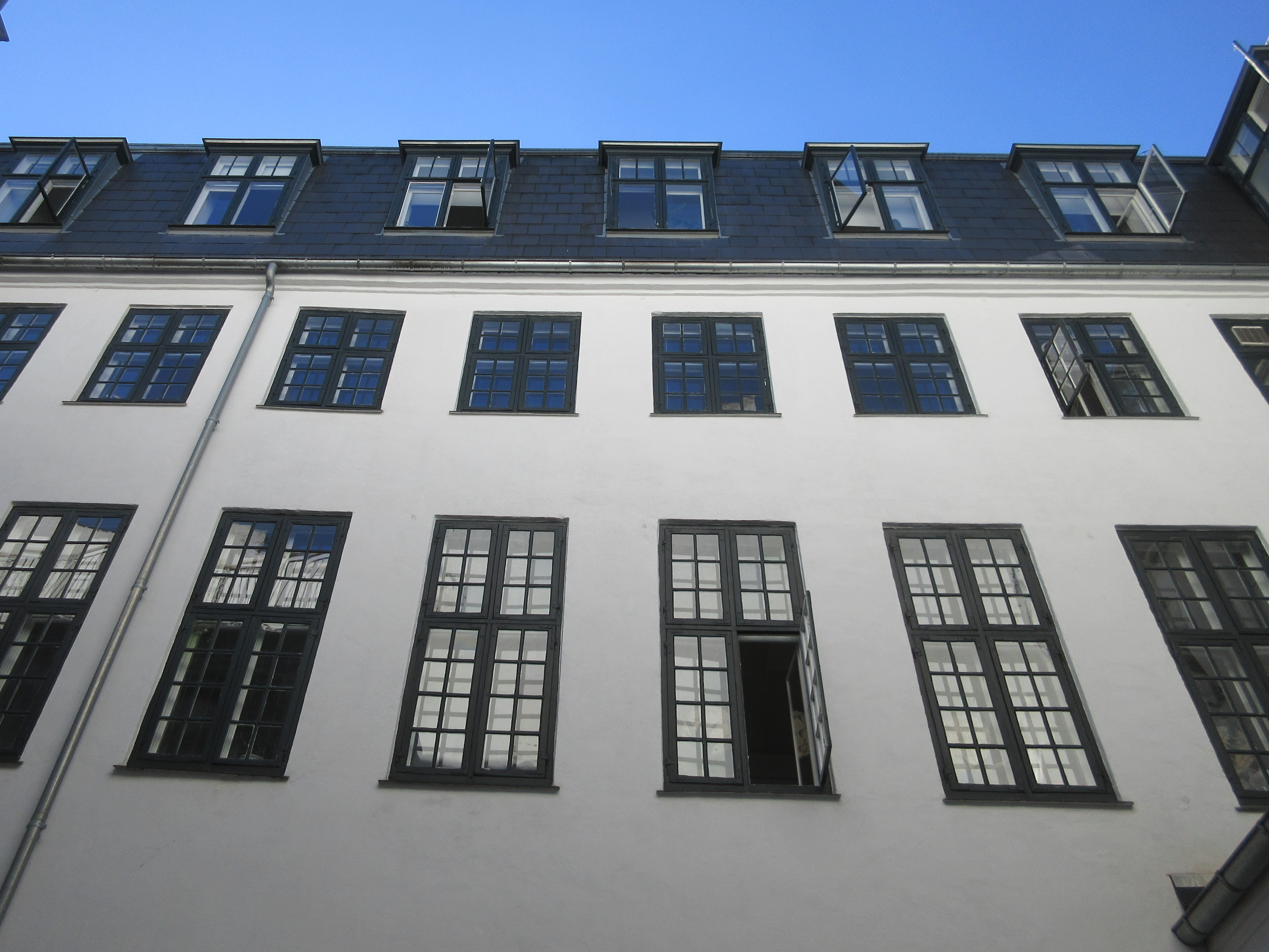
The side wing.

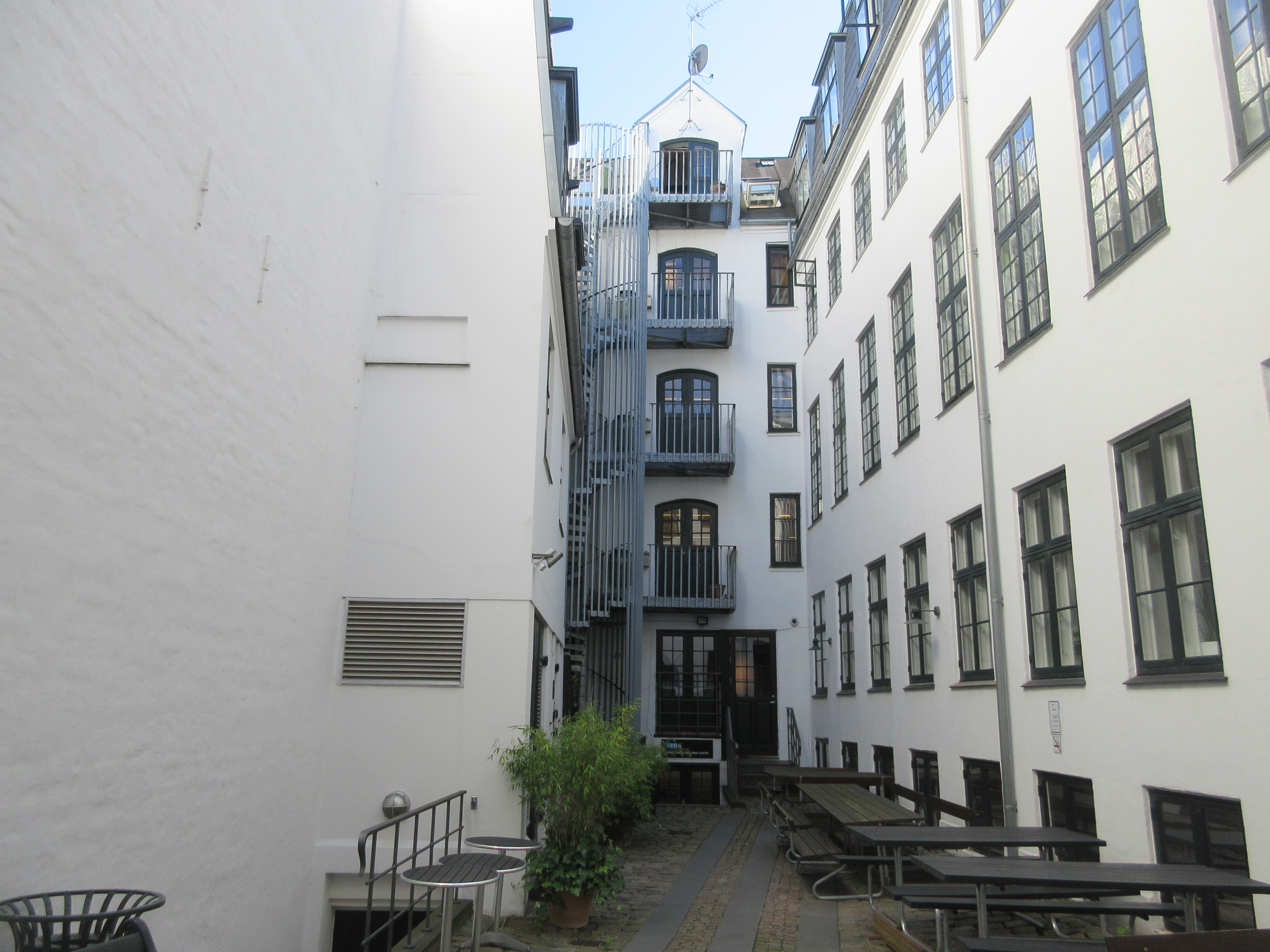
The rear wing.

== See also ==
- Vestergade 7
