= André Noël (sport shooter) =

French sports shooter

Personal information
- Born: 29 September 1932 (age 93) Chaource, France

Sport
- Sport: Sports shooting

André Noël (born 29 September 1932) is a French former sports shooter. He competed at the 1968 Summer Olympics and the 1972 Summer Olympics.
