= Eduard Maria Oettinger =

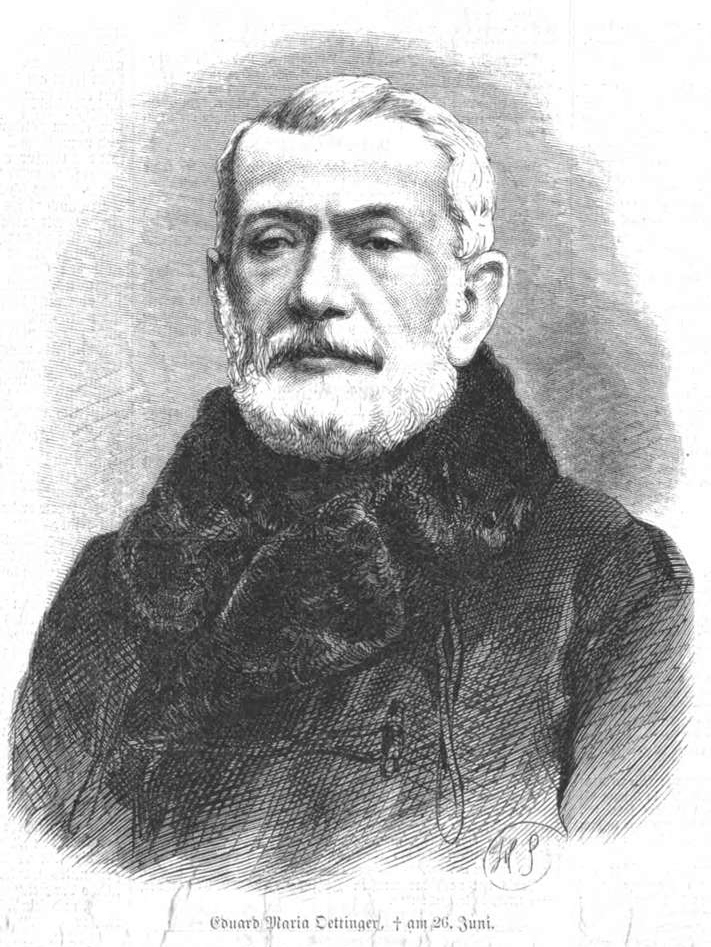
- Born: 19 November 1808; Wrocław
- Died: 26 June 1872 (aged 63); Blasewitz
- Occupation: Journalist; bibliographer; writer; historian; editing staff

Eduard Maria Oettinger (19 November 1808 – 26 June 1872) was a German journalist, poet and bibliographer. He was born at Breslau, in Silesia, of Jewish parents. Having studied at the gymnasium of his native place, he went to Vienna, and joined the Roman Catholic Church when he was 20. After 1829 he edited different periodicals at Berlin, Hamburg, Mannheim, and Leipzig, and wrote several dramas, novels, and romances. He died in a village near Dresden.

- His poems, which he published under the title Buch der Liebe, were published at Leipzig in 1850. Besides a historical work- Geschichte des danischen Hofs von Christian II, bis Friedrich VII (Hamburg, 1859, 8 vols.)
- He published his famous bibliographical work, Bibliographie biographique, ou dictionnaire de 26,000 ouvrages, relatifs a l'histoire de la vie publique et privee des hommes celebres de tons les temps et de toutes les nations (Leipzig 1850; the same in 2 vols. Paris, 1866):
- Historisches Archiv, enthaltend ein systematisch – chronologisch geordnetes Verzeichniss von 17,000 der brauchbarsten Quellenzum Studium der Geschichte (Karlsruhe, 1841):
- Moniteur des dates, contenant un million de renseignements biographiques, geneal. et historiques (Dresden, 1866–1868, 6 vols. 4to) – a work which, as a biographico-genealogico-historical lexicon, is not only indispensable to librarians, historians, and bibliographers, but which at its first appearance was unanimously praised as a gigantic work of German industry and scholarship. A supplement to his Monitelur des dates is now published by Dr. H. Schramm, the biographer of Oettinger. See Literarischer Handweiser (1872), p. 368; Kurz, Literaturgeschichte, vol. iv (see Index); Dr. K. Schutze, Deutschlands Dichter und Dichterinnen, s.v.
