= Jean-Charles Laveaux =

French grammarian and translator

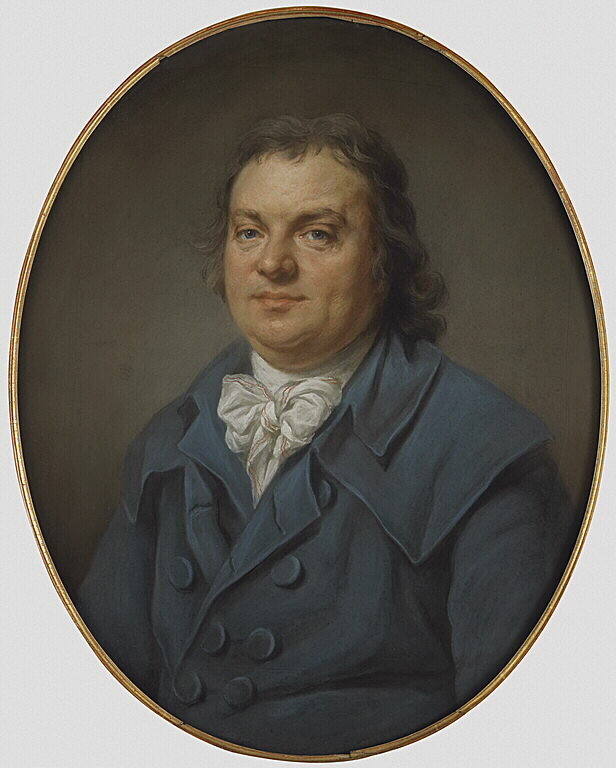
Photo of Jean-Charles Laveaux

Jean-Charles Laveaux (French pronunciation: [ʒɑ̃ ʃaʁl lavo]; 17 November 1749, Troyes – 15 March 1827, Paris) was a French grammarian and translator.

== Bibliography ==
Also a journalist, an historian and translator, he wrote several dictionaries among which his Dictionnaire synonymique and his Dictionnaire raisonné des difficultés grammaticales et littéraires left a mark in the history of French lexicography.

After studying at Troyes and Paris, Jean-Charles Laveaux was teacher of French in Basel, then professor of French literature in Stuttgart and Berlin, where Frederick the Great invited him to participate in historical work on the Prussian monarchy.

Back in France in 1791, he headed the political and literary newspaper Le Courrier de Strasbourg, then moved a year later to Paris where he was editor of the Journal de la Montagne during the reign of Terror. After several stays in prison, he left politics and became professor of ancient languages and office manager at the prefecture of the Seine under the Consulate and inspector general of prisons and asylums of the Seine under the Empire, a post he was deposed of at the Bourbon Restoration.

== Main publications ==
- Cours théorique et pratique de langue et de littérature française (2 volumes, 1784-1785) vol 1 available at Gallica, vol 2 available at Gallica
- Dictionnaire français-allemand et allemand-français (2 volumes, 1784-1785; 1803)
- Eusèbe, ou les Beaux profits de la vertu dans le siècle où nous vivons (1785)
- Vie de Frédéric II, roi de Prusse, accompagnée de remarques, pièces justificatives, et d’un grand nombre d’anecdotes dont la plupart n’ont point encore été publiées (7 volumes, 1787-1789)
- De la Monarchie prussienne sous Frédéric le Grand (avec Jakob von Mauvillon, 8 volumes, 1788)
- Frédéric II, Voltaire, Jean-Jacques d’Alembert et l’Académie de Berlin vengés du Secrétaire perpétuel de cette académie (Formey), ou M. Formey peint par lui-même avec plusieurs lettres curieuses de M. Voltaire (1789)
- Journal d’instruction civique et politique dédié aux citoyens de bonne foi (1793)
- Histoire des premiers peuples libres qui ont habité la France (avec Nicolas Moutardier, 3 volumes, 1798)
- Histoire de Pierre III, empereur de Russie, suivie de l’Histoire secrète des amours et des principaux amans de Catherine II (3 volumes, 1798)
- Nouveau dictionnaire de la langue française (2 volumes, 1820; 1828)
- Dictionnaire raisonné des difficultés grammaticales et littéraires de la langue française (1818; 1822). Réédité par son petit-fils, Charles Marty-Laveaux, en 1846. available at Gallica
- Nouveau dictionnaire portatif de la langue française (1825) available at Gallica
- Dictionnaire synonymique de la langue française (1826)

=== Editions ===
- Œuvres posthumes de Frédéric II, roi de Prusse (15 volumes, 1788)
- Dictionnaire de l’Académie française, augmenté de plus de vingt mille mots (1842)

=== Translations ===
- Christoph Martin Wieland : Musarion, ou la Philosophie des Grâces (1780) Texte en ligne
- Erasmus : Éloge de la folie (1782)
- Michael Ignaz Schmidt : Histoire des Allemands (8 volumes, 1784-1789)
- Ludwig Müller : Tableau des guerres de Frédéric le Grand, ou Plans figurés de vingt-six batailles rangées ou combats essentiels donnés dans les trois guerres de Silésie, avec une explication précise de chaque bataille (1785)
- Johann Martin Miller : Siegwart (2 volumes, 1785)
- Marcus Elieser Bloch : Ichthyologie, ou Histoire naturelle générale et particulière des poissons, avec des figures enluminées (6 volumes, 1785-1797)
- Franz Georg Anton von Miller : Tactique pure pour l’infanterie, la cavalerie et l’artillerie (2 volumes, 1788)
- Georg Joachim Zollikofer : Sermons sur le prix des choses les plus importantes de ce monde, suivis d’Exercices de piété (2 volumes, 1798)

=== Journalism ===
- Journal de la Montagne (1793-1794)
