= Thomasine Christine Gyllembourg-Ehrensvärd =

Danish author

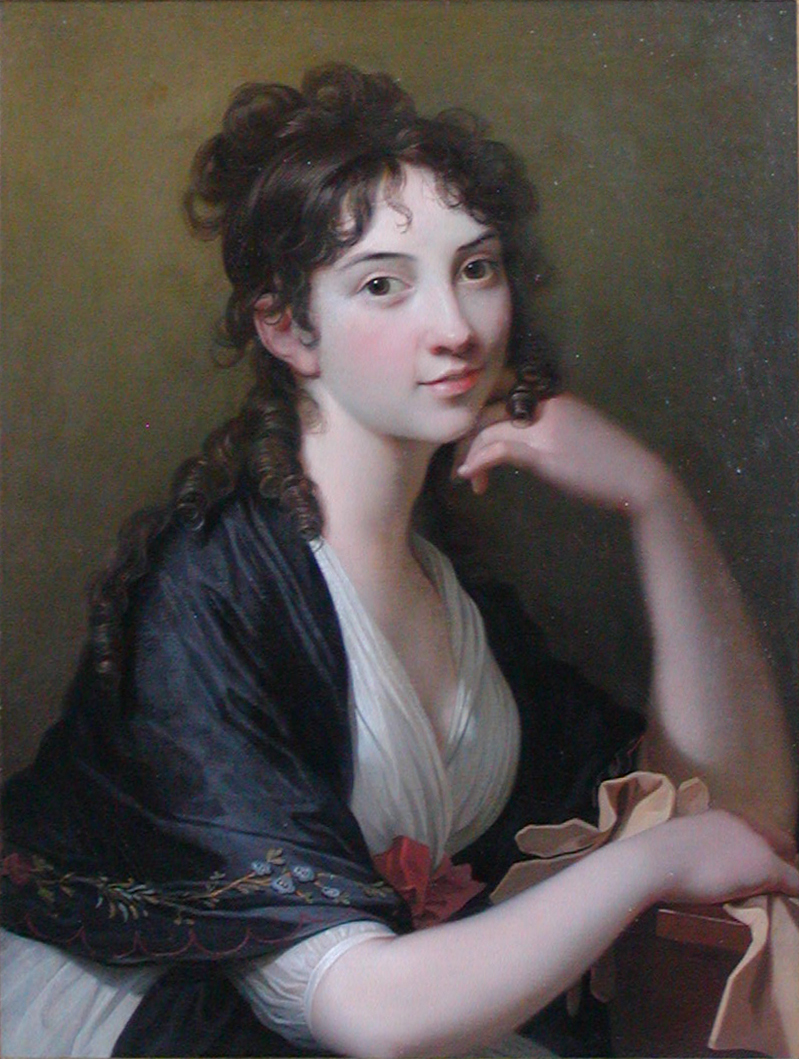
Painting by Jens Juel, c. 1790, Frederiksborgmuseet, Hillerød, Denmark

Baroness Thomasine Christine Gyllembourg-Ehrensvärd (9 November 1773 – 2 July 1856) was a Danish author, born in Copenhagen. Her maiden name was Buntzen.

== Life and writing ==
She married the famous writer Peter Andreas Heiberg when she was 16 years old. They had a son in the following year, the poet and critic Johan Ludvig Heiberg. In 1800, her husband was exiled for political activity and she obtained a divorce, marrying in December 1801 the Swedish Baron Carl Fredrik Ehrensvärd, who was himself a political fugitive, as implicated in the murder in 1792 of Swedish king Gustavus III. Her second husband, who presently adopted the name of Gyllembourg (after his mother, who belonged to the Gyllenborg family), died in 1815.

In 1822 she followed her son to Kiel, where he was appointed professor, and in 1825 she returned with him to Copenhagen. In 1827 she first appeared anonymously as an author by publishing the romance Familien Polonius (The Polonius Family) in her son's newspaper Flyvende Post (The Flying Post). In 1828 the same journal contained Den Magiske Nøgle (The Magic Key), which was immediately followed by En Hverdags-Historie (An Everyday Story). The success of this anonymous work was so great that she adopted the name of "The author of An Everyday Story" until the end of her career.

In 1833–1834 she published three volumes of Old and New Novels followed in 1835–1836 by New Stories which also consisted of 3 volumes. In 1837 she published two novels, Montanus den Yngre (Montanus the Younger) and Nisida (Ricida). Een i Alle (One in All) was published in 1840, Nær og Fjern (Near and Far) in 1841, En Brevvexling (A Correspondence) in 1843, Korsveien (The Cross Ways) in 1844 and To Tidsaldre (Two Ages) in 1845.

From 1849 to 1851 the Baroness Gyllembourg-Ehrensvärd was engaged in bringing out a library edition of her collected works in twelve volumes. On 2 July 1856 she died in her son's house at Copenhagen. Throughout her life she had preserved the closest reticence on the subject of her authorship, even with her nearest friends, and it was only after her death that her authorship became known to the public.

== Cultural references ==
Per Olov Enquist's 1981 play Från regnormarnas liv (Rain Snake) describes the relationship between Gyllenbourg and Heilberg. Anne Marie Ejrnæs's 2002 novel Som Svalen (Like the Swallow) is a biographical novel about Thomasine Gyllembourg.

The highest denomination (1,000 kroner) of the Danish 1972 banknote series features an engraving of her based on Juel's portrait.

== Works ==
- Familien Polonius (1827)
- En Hverdags-Historie (1828)
- Den magiske Nøgle (1830)
- Kong Hjort (1830)
- Slægtskab og Djævelskab (1830)
- Den lille Karen (1830)
- Sproglæreren (1831) – play
- Magt og List (1831) – play
- Fregatskibet Svanen (1831) – play
- Drøm og Virkelighed (1833)
- Mesalliance (1833)
- De Forlovede (1834) – play
- Findeløn (1834)
- De lyse Nætter (1834)
- Ægtestand (1835)
- En Episode (1835)
- Extremerne (1835)
- Jøden (1836)
- Hvidkappen (1836)
- Montanus den Yngre (1837)
- Nisida (1837)
- Maria (1839)
- Een i Alle (1840)
- Nær og fjern (1841)
- Jens Drabelig (1841)
- En Brevvexling (1843)
- Korsveien (1844)
- Castor og Pollux (1844)
- To Tidsaldre (1845)

== English translations ==
- "An Everyday Story," trans. Troy Wellington Smith, The Bridge, vol. 42, no. 1 (2019): 9–46.
- Thomasine Gyllembourg's Two Ages: A Novella, ed. and trans. Troy Wellington Smith, Texts from Golden Age Denmark, vol. 9 (Leiden and Boston: Brill, 2026).
