= Johan Ludvig Heiberg (poet) =

Danish poet, playwright, literary critic and literary historian (1791–1860)

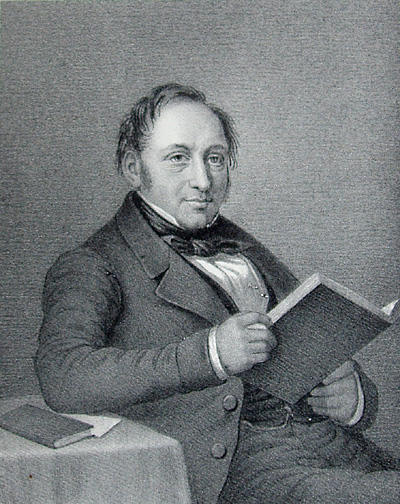
Johan Ludvig Heiberg

Johan Ludvig Heiberg (14 December 1791 – 25 August 1860), Danish poet, playwright, literary critic, literary historian son of the political writer Peter Andreas Heiberg (1758–1841), and of the novelist, afterwards the Baroness Gyllembourg-Ehrensvärd, was born in Copenhagen. He promoted Hegelian philosophy and introduced vaudeville to Denmark.

== Biography ==
In 1800 his father was exiled and settled in Paris, where he was employed in the French foreign office, retiring in 1817 with a pension. His political and satirical writings continued to exercise great influence over his fellow countrymen. Johan Ludvig Heiberg was taken by K.L. Rahbek and his wife into their house, Bakkehuset. He was educated at the University of Copenhagen, and his first publication, entitled The Theatre for Marionettes (1814), included two romantic dramas. This was followed by Christmas Jokes and New Years Tricks (1816), The Initiation of Psyche (1817), and The Prophecy of Tycho Brahe, a satire on the eccentricities of the Romantic writers, especially on the sentimentality of Ingemann. These works attracted attention at a time when Baggesen, Oehlenschläger and Ingemann possessed the popular ear, and were understood at once to be the opening of a great career.

In 1817 Heiberg took his degree, and in 1819 went abroad with a grant from government. He proceeded to Paris, and spent the next three years there with his father. In 1822 he published his drama Nina and was made professor of the Danish language at the University of Kiel, where he delivered a course of lectures, comparing the Scandinavian mythology as found in the Edda with the poems of Oehlenschläger. These lectures were published in German in 1827.

In 1825 Heiberg came back to Copenhagen for the purpose of introducing the vaudeville on the Danish stage. He composed a great number of these vaudevilles, of which the best known are King Solomon and George the Hatmaker (1825); April Fools (1826); A Story in Rosenborg Garden (1827); Kjøge Huskors (1831); The Danes in Paris (1833); No (1836); and Yes (1839). He took his models from the French theatre, but showed extraordinary skill in blending the words and the music; but the subjects and the humour were essentially Danish and even topical.

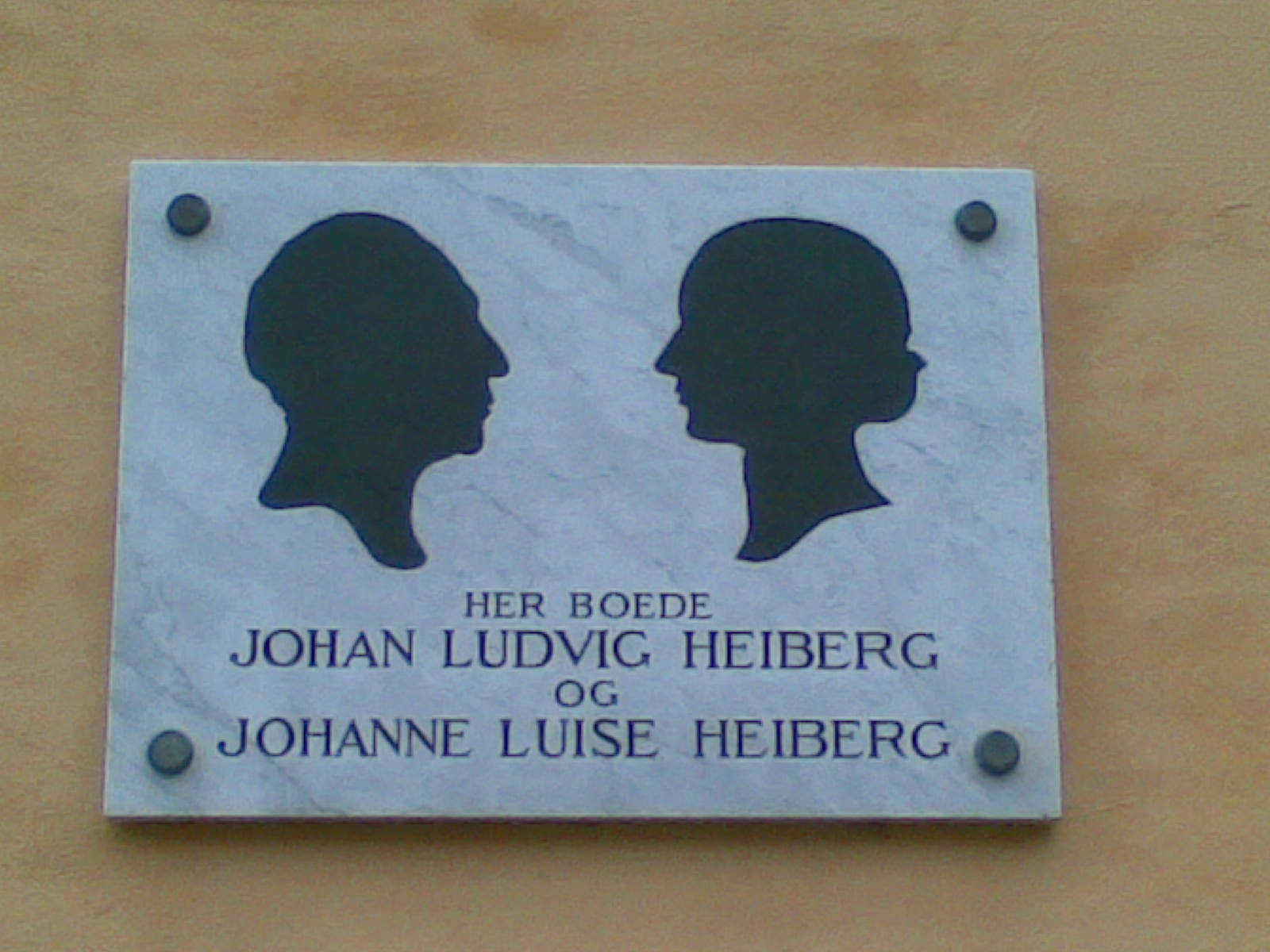
Plaque on their home in Christianshavn.

Meanwhile he was producing dramatic work of a more serious kind; in 1828 he brought out the national drama of Elves' Hill (Danish: Elverhøi); in 1830 The Inseparables; in 1835 the fairy comedy of The Elves, a dramatic version of Tieck's Elfin; and in 1838 Fata Morgana. In 1841 Heiberg published a volume of New Poems containing A Soul after Death, a comedy which is perhaps his masterpiece, The Newly Wedded Pair, and other pieces.

He edited from 1827 to 1830 the famous weekly, the Flyvende Post (The Flying Post), and subsequently the Interimsblade (1834–1837) and the Intelligensblade (1842–1843). In his journalism he carried on his warfare against the excessive pretensions of the Romanticists, and produced much valuable and penetrating criticism of art and literature. In 1831 he married the great actress Johanne Luise Pätges (1812–1890), the author of some popular vaudevilles.

Heiberg's scathing satires, however, made him very unpopular; and this antagonism reached its height when, in 1845, he published his malicious little drama of The Nut Crackers. Nevertheless he became in 1849 director of the Royal Theatre in Copenhagen. He filled the post for seven years, working with great zeal and conscientiousness, but was forced by intrigues from without to resign it in 1856.

Heiberg died at Bonderup Manor, near Ringsted, on 25 August 1860.

== Philosophy ==
Heiberg's speculative philosophy had relation to Hegel and Kierkegaard, and dealt a lot with the perception of God. His work Om Vaudevillen (1826) has been described as an attack to Dilettantism, "a curse on the age's materialism or atheism in art, a critical attack on the prevailing aesthethics of content," as well as "a strong defense of true science," lifelong study, free laughter, satire and comedy. Heiberg tried to reconcile Hegel's philosophy with Christianity, for instance, equating Hegel's concept of Spirit, with the view of the Christian God; at other times he seems to prefer the Christian doctrine.

== Legacy ==
His influence upon taste and critical opinion was greater than that of any writer of his time, and can only be compared with that of Holberg in the 18th century. Most of the poets of the Romantic movement in Denmark were very grave and serious; Heiberg added the element of humour, elegance and irony. He had the genius of good taste, and his witty and delicate productions stand almost unique in the literature of his country. First of all he created a Danish critical tradition based upon firm and consequent principles of aesthetics breaking with the often extremely subjective and occasional value judgements of his predecessors. In return he has not avoided being regarded a conservative formalist and elitist by posterity and the reaction against his line was already started by Georg Brandes who was, however, affected by his school too. At any rate most of later Danish critics had to make up their mind about his ideas.

The poetical works of Heiberg were collected, in 11 volumes, in 1861–1862, and his prose writings (11 volumes) in the same year. The last volume of his works contains fragments of autobiography. See also Georg Brandes, Essays (1889). For the elder Heiberg see monographs by Thaarup (1883) and by Schwanenflügel (1891).
