= Reentry (disambiguation) =

Atmospheric entry, or reentry, is the movement of human-made or natural objects as they enter the atmosphere of a planet from outer space.

Reentry may also refer to:

== Music ==
- Re-Entry (Big Brovaz album)
- Re-Entry (Marley Marl album)
- Re-Entry (Techno Animal album)
- Re-Entry by The Phenomenauts
- Re-entry, or reentrant tuning, an effect that occurs with a break in the sequence of pitches to which the strings of a stringed instrument are tuned

== Science and healthcare ==
- Reentry (neural circuitry) in neuroscience
- Re-entry, or reentrant dysrhythmia, a type of cardiac arrhythmia
- Skip reentry

== Other uses ==
- Prisoner reentry, also referred to simply as "reentry", the process by which prisoners who have been released return to the community
- Re-Entry (dragster), a streamliner dragster

== See also ==
- Reentrant (disambiguation)
