= Wider than the Sky =

2004 book by Gerald M. Edelman

- Author: Gerald M. Edelman
- Language: English
- Subject: Neuroscience
- Publisher: Yale University Press
- Publication date: 2004
- ISBN: 9780300107616

Wider than the Sky: The Phenomenal Gift of Consciousness is an English-language book on neuroscience by the neuroscientist Gerald M. Edelman. Yale University Press published the book in 2004. The book includes a glossary, a bibliographic note, and an index. The title alludes to an English-language poem written by Emily Dickinson in about 1862. In that poem, Dickinson describes the brain as "wider than the sky", "deeper than the sea", and "just the weight of God".

In the preface, Edelman describes, as follows, the purpose of the book:

A scientific analysis of consciousness must answer the question: How can the firings of neurons give rise to subjective sensations, thoughts, and emotions? To some, the two domains are so disparate as to be irreconcilable. A scientific explanation must provide a causal account of the connection between these domains so that properties in one domain may be understood in terms of events in the other. This is the task I have set myself in this small book.

The book's content is similar to the 2000 book Edelman co-authored: A Universe of Consciousness: How Matter Becomes Imagination. Both books put forward the theory of neuronal group selection, also known as neural Darwinism. Both books make a distinction between primary consciousness and higher-order consciousness.

== Reviews ==
- Shermer, Michael (March 2004). "The major unsolved problem in biology". Scientific American. 290 (3): 103–105. Bibcode:2004SciAm.290c.103S. doi:10.1038/scientificamerican0304-103.
- Wilson, David L. (December 2005). "Wider Than the Sky: The Phenomenal Gift of Consciousness". Quarterly Review of Biology. 80 (4): 501. doi:10.1086/501314.
- Laureys, Steven (21 April 2005). "Wider Than the Sky: The Phenomenal Gift of Consciousness". New England Journal of Medicine. 352 (16): s1728. doi:10.1056/NEJM200504213521626.
- Blackmore, Susan (1 October 2004). "Half a second to stop being wicked". Times Higher Education Supplement (1660): 26.
