= Olaf Sporns =

German neuroscientist

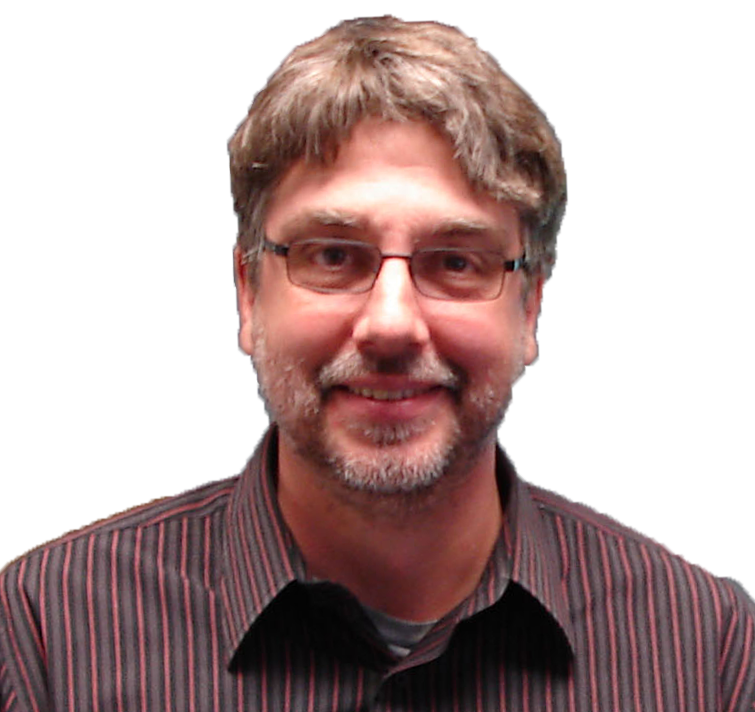
- Olaf Sporns
- Born: September 18, 1963 (age 62); Kiel, Schleswig-Holstein, West Germany
- Education: University of Tübingen (B.A., 1986); Rockefeller University (Ph.D., 1990)
- Scientific career
- Fields: Neuroscience, Cognitive Science
- Workplaces: Indiana University
- Thesis: Synthetic neural modeling: computer simulations of perceptual and motor systems (1990)
- Doctoral advisor: Gerald Edelman

Olaf Sporns (born 18 September 1963) is Provost Professor in Psychological and Brain Sciences at Indiana University and scientific co-director of the university's Network Science Institute. He is the founding editor of the academic journal Network Neuroscience, published by MIT Press.

Sporns received his degree from University of Tübingen in Tübingen, West Germany, before going to New York to study at the Rockefeller University under Gerald Edelman. After receiving his doctorate, he followed Edelman to the Neurosciences Institute in La Jolla, California.

His focus is in the area of computational cognitive neuroscience. His topics of study include functional integration and binding in the cerebral cortex, neural models of perception and action, network structure and dynamics, applications of information theory to the brain and embodied cognitive science using robotics. He was awarded a Guggenheim Fellowship in 2011 in the Natural Sciences category.

== Research ==
Brain complexity

One of the core areas of research being conducted by Sporns is in the area of complexity of the brain. One aspect in particular is how small-world network effects are seen in the neural connections which are decentralized in the brain. Research in collaboration with scientists across the world has revealed that there are pathways in the brain that are very well connected. This is insightful for understanding how the architecture of the brain may relate to schizophrenia, autism and Alzheimer's disease.

Sporns is also interested in understanding the relationship between statistical properties of neuronal populations and perceptual data. How does an organism use and structure its environment in such a way as to achieve (statistically) complex input? To this end, he has run statistical analysis on movement patterns and input within simulations, videos, and robotic devices.

Reward systems

Sporns also has a research interest in reward models of the brain utilizing robots. The reward models have shown ways in which dopamine is onset by drug addiction.

Other

Though not directly related to his core research, in early 2000 Sporns was interested in developing robots with human-like qualities in their ability to learn.

== Publications ==
Books

- Olaf Sporns (2010). Networks of the Brain. MIT Press. ISBN 978-0-262-01469-4.
- Olaf Sporns (2012). Discovering the Human Connectome. MIT Press. ISBN 978-0-262-01790-9.

== See also ==
- Biologically inspired computing
- Connectome
- Parmenides Foundation
- The Mind's I
