= A Universe of Consciousness =

2000 book by Gerald Maurice Edelman and Giulio Tononi

A Universe of Consciousness: How Matter Becomes Imagination
- Author: Gerald Maurice Edelman; Giulio Tononi
- Language: English
- Subject: Consciousness
- Published: 2000
- Publisher: Basic Books
- Publication place: United States
- Pages: 274
- ISBN: 9780465013760

A Universe of Consciousness: How Matter Becomes Imagination is a 2000 book by biologists Gerald Maurice Edelman and Giulio Tononi; published in UK as Consciousness: How Matter Becomes Imagination. This book, written with Giulio Tononi, is the culmination of a series of works by Gerald Edelman on the workings of the brain which include Neural Darwinism and Bright Air, Brilliant Fire.

== Synopsis ==
It is divided into six sections: the first three cover existing work from philosophical, neurological and Darwinian perspectives. Part IV presents the novel thesis of the work: the Dynamic Core Hypothesis. The remaining two parts explore how it resolves various philosophical and practical issues.

=== The Background ===
Since Descartes, philosophers have been occupied with the concept of consciousness and its subjective nature has posed a special problem for science. Its nature arises from the neuronal structures in the brain and some understanding of these, together with the experimental tools needed to explore them, is given in the following chapters. They then recapitulate Edelman's still controversial theory of somatic selectionism during early development which controls the topology of a particular brain and enables restructuring in response to experience. They argue that memory is not a symbolic representation but a reflection of how the brain has changed its dynamics in order to achieve motor activity. This leads to a discussion of primary consciousness which integrates with perception into a means of directing immediate behavior and requires significant levels of reentrancy to achieve its effects.

=== The Dynamic Core Hypothesis ===
The problem of integrating, or binding, the activity of functionally segregated areas of the brain in order to concentrate attention on a particular activity in a short amount of time (typically 100-250 msecs) after the presentation of a stimulus is explored by means of large-scale simulations. It is shown that this can only happen if some elements interact more strongly among themselves than with the rest of the system including a large amount of reentrancy. These functional clusters are only slowly coming into the range of PET or fMRI scanning technology which commonly require much longer time scales.

At any given time, only a small subset of the neuronal groups in the brain are contributing directly to consciousness and this cluster is called a dynamic core. It represents a single point of view and each different state of consciousness corresponds to a different subset. Some dissociative disorders such as schizophrenia may result in the formation of multiple cores.

=== Implications of the hypothesis ===
One of the recurring issues in consciousness is the existence of qualia, such as redness, warmth and pain. It is not enough to identify each quale with a particular neuron or neuronal group; what is crucial is all the other groups which are highly influenced by the sensation and will fire at the same time. Thus each conscious state deserves to be called a quale. A small perturbation of a group of neurons can affect the whole in a very short space of time provided the system is kept in a state of readiness by the thalamus. Primary consciousness can build up a bodily based reference space even before language and higher-order consciousness appear.

There is a preliminary approach to the relationship between conscious and unconscious processes, including sensors and motors, because so little is known. The evolution of language centres in the brain leads to higher order consciousness which enhances subjective experience and enables humans to describe qualia which are however experienced by a much wider range of animals. Thinking in humans has a range of representations—including pictorial. In contrast to computers which are Turing machines, brains are based on neuronal group selection.

== See also ==
- Wider than the Sky: The Phenomenal Gift of Consciousness, a similar 2004 book by Edelman
