= The Mind's I =

1981 book edited by Douglas Hofstadter and Daniel Dennett

- Cover of the first edition
- Editors: Douglas R. Hofstadter; Daniel C. Dennett
- Language: English
- Subject: The self
- Publisher: Basic Books
- Publication date: 1981
- Publication place: United States; United Kingdom
- Media type: Print (Hardcover and Paperback)
- Pages: 501
- ISBN: 0-553-34584-2

The Mind's I: Fantasies and Reflections on Self and Soul is a 1981 collection of essays and other texts about the nature of the mind and the self, edited with commentary by philosophers Douglas R. Hofstadter and Daniel C. Dennett. The texts range from early philosophical and fictional musings on a subject that could seemingly only be examined in the realm of thought, to works from the twentieth century where the nature of the self became a viable topic for scientific study.

== Summary ==
The book's chapters are each made up of a previously published work by authors such as Jorge Luis Borges, Alan Turing, Richard Dawkins, Raymond Smullyan, John Searle, Stanisław Lem, Thomas Nagel (as well as Hofstadter and Dennett themselves), each followed up by a commentary by Hofstadter and/or Dennett. Dennett and Hofstadter both support the idea that we can learn much about human minds and souls by exploring human mentality in terms of information processing. Dennett and Hofstadter are both proponents of the idea that the wonders of human mentality can be accounted for by mechanical brain processes—which leaves nothing theoretical to prevent us from building human-like mental processes into our mechanical devices. A few views that run counter to this notion, such as John Searle's widely known presentation of the Chinese room argument, are included in this book mainly as targets for refutation.

The book is divided into six sections, each focusing on a particular aspect of the problem of self.

=== Part I ===
Part I, "A Sense of Self", begins with two works of fiction that challenge the notions of self and identity (including the Argentine writer Jorge Luis Borges's "Borges and I"), provoking the reader to think more closely about just what is meant by "self". It closes with an essay by Harold J. Morowitz on the reductionist view of the mind.

=== Part II ===
Part II, entitled "Soul Searching", takes on the idea of soul—that spark which separates thinking beings from unthinking machines. Included here is Alan Turing's famous article from 1950, in which he proposes an operational test—popularly known as the "Turing test"—for machine intelligence, judged successful if a machine can use human language well enough to pass as human. This goal was distant at the time. A dialogue of Hofstadter's own picks up the idea of the Turing test and spins a thought-provoking scenario from it.

Two chapters excerpted from The Soul of Anna Klane, a novel by Terrel Miedaner, end the section. Hofstadter interprets them in accordance with his own atheistic beliefs, without acknowledgment of Miedaner's opposite intent, which used them to support alternative ideas about the nature of mind and soul.

=== Part III ===
The formation of mind from elements individually incapable of thought is the central theme of Part III, "From Hardware to Software". The evolution of the mind toward its current state is addressed in the first two reprinted works. Following that is a reprint of "Prelude... Ant Fugue" from Hofstadter's Pulitzer-winning book, Gödel, Escher, Bach, in which he builds up the metaphor of the mind as anthill: each individual part with only rudimentary function, coming together to be more than the sum of its parts.

=== Part IV ===
Part IV explores its titular issue, "Mind as Program". What is the self: the mind, or the body? Can they be separated? Can the location of the consciousness be separate from one's physical location. In that case, where are you, really? Dennett's fantastical account of being separated from his brain and David Sanford's response tackle these issues. In this section the mind is considered as software: as patterns of thought and action, as separate from the physical body housing it as a piece of software is from the machine it runs on.

=== Part V ===
Part V, "Created Selves and Free Will", includes John Searle's notorious "Minds, Brains, and Programs" (originally an article published in The Behavioral and Brain Sciences, 1980), which states: "...mental processes are computational processes over formally defined elements." Searle has objections to the idea that computer programs might ever produce mind, but the idea that mentality involves computation can be traced through the history of Western philosophy where it has long been explored in the context of trying to explain human reason in terms of formal logical systems. A dramatic and famous rejection of the formal systems idea was that of Ludwig Wittgenstein, a philosopher whom Dennett respects. After first embracing the idea of reducing everything to logical atoms (Tractatus Logico-Philosophicus), Wittgenstein later rejected the idea that human language games should be formulated as formal systems (Philosophical Investigations). However, many philosophers and artificial intelligence researchers remain captivated by the formal systems approach. For example, Dennett has tried to help the MIT Cog project develop formal computer programming methods towards the goal of producing human-like intelligence. In his book "Contemporary Philosophy of Mind", Georges Rey provides an example of continuing attempts to express human intelligence in machines through computational processes over formally defined elements. An alternative but minority approach has grown out of the work of people like Gerald Edelman and his student Olaf Sporns through which it is suggested that machine intelligence can most efficiently be achieved by creating autonomous robotic systems that can learn the way human children learn through interacting with their environment.

=== Part VI ===
The book closes with "The Inner Eye", a collection of short pieces on the subjective nature of experience. How can one describe what it is like to be a particular entity, without actually being it yourself? Thomas Nagel, Raymond Smullyan, Douglas Hofstadter, and Robert Nozick tackle the problem of translating the experiences of one being into terms another can understand. But can we ever know what it is like to be another self? For that matter, what can we know about what it is like to be ourselves? Hofstadter and Dennett's commentary suggest that self-knowledge is elusive, to say nothing of the experience of other minds.

== Reception ==
Historian of psychology Jeremy Burman, while calling The Mind's I "a wonderful book", described it as popularizing a non-metaphorical reading of Richard Dawkins' proposals regarding memes, leading to widespread misunderstanding (in the form of memetics) and the reification of the original idea-as-replicator metaphor.

Neuropsychologist Nicholas Humphrey, writing in The London Review of Books gave The Mind's I a mixed review, stating "People who like this kind of thing will undoubtedly find this book the kind of thing they like. Counting myself among them, I would reckon The Mind's I cheap at twice the price." However, he criticized the emphasis the book places on paradoxes, stating "Paradoxes are fun; they can be illuminating. But we should be wary of the temptation to celebrate paradoxes as a royal road to some higher level of reality."

Professor of philosophy William Barrett, writing in The New York Times gave The Mind's I a mixed review. He stated that the book represented a "welcome sign of change" from the prevailing attitudes in philosophy which emphasized the objective over the subjective but stated that "for all its stimulation, I found the book rather confusing, and even confused, in its effect", criticizing Hofstadter's contributions in particular. Daniel Dennett later wrote a letter to the New York Times defending Hofstadter and calling Barrett's stance "preposterous".
