= Paul David Gottlieb =

Paul David Gottlieb (December 4, 1943 – November 1, 2003) was an American immunological researcher and professor of medical genetics and microbiology.

Paul D. Gottlieb grew up in Highland Park, New Jersey and received his secondary school education at Rutgers Preparatory School. In 1965 he graduated with a bachelor's degree in biology from Princeton University, where he wrote his senior thesis under the supervision of Noboru Sueoka. In autumn 1965 Gottlieb became a graduate student at Rockefeller University. On December 27, 1969, in Montgomery, Alabama, he married Nell Wallace Harrell, whom he met at Rockefeller University. She graduated from Boston University with a Ph.D. in sociology.

Paul Gottlieb received his Ph.D. in 1971 from Rockefeller University. He was part of a team of 11 scientists led by Gerald Edelman. Achieving a major scientific breakthrough, they determined the molecular structure of gamma globulin. Disulfide bonds link together the protein subunits structure of antibody proteins. The protein subunits of antibodies are of two types, the larger heavy chains and the smaller light chains. Gottlieb's contribution was to determine a considerable part of the molecular structure of the light chains.

He was a postdoc at Rockefeller University and then Stanford University. In 1980 he became a professor of molecular genetics and microbiology at the University of Texas at Austin. There he also served for some years as chair of the department and in 2001 became director of the School of Biological Sciences. Upon his death he was survived by his wife and their daughter, Erin A. Gottlieb, M.D.

In 1989 he was elected a Fellow of the American Association for the Advancement of Science. As a memorial tribute, the University of Texas at Austin established the Dr. Paul Gottlieb Lecture Series.
