= The Soul of Anna Klane =

Science Fiction novel

- Author: Terrel Miedaner
- Cover artist: Vincent Topazio
- Language: English
- Genre: Science fiction
- Publisher: Coward, McCann & Geoghegan
- Publication date: 1977
- Publication place: United States
- Media type: Print (hardcover and paperback)
- Pages: 178
- ISBN: 0450039374

The Soul of Anna Klane is a 1977 Science Fiction novel by Terrel Miedaner. The plot centers on the trial of the scientist Anatol Klane, the father of Anna Klane, an exceptional ten-years-old child. Klane is accused of Anna's murder following a brain surgery she underwent; he claims his daughter's soul departed from her body in the surgery (to which he objected), and the defense line centers around trying to scientifically prove the existence of souls in humans.

== Reception ==
The book received mostly mediocre reviews upon its release, with Kirkus Reviews noting that "If pop metaphysics are your game, there are a few sparks in the courtroom dialogue; otherwise... bzzzt", and Newgate Callendar, in a review of several crime novels in The New York Times noting that while the opening is interesting, "after a while the book bogs down in didacticism". A more scorching review was published in The Wichita Beacon, calling the book an "engagingly silly novel" and cynically concluding that "one suspects ... the author ate too much pizza before going to bed one night, with the resulting dreams turned into this book."

== Discussions and adaptations ==
Frame from the credit roll of the film The Beast, indicating that it was adapted from The Soul of Anna Klane.

Two sections from the book, "The Soul of Martha, a Beast" (an excerpt from Chapter 13) and "The Soul of the Mark III Beast" (an excerpt from Chapter 23) were included in The Mind's I, with reflections about both provided by Douglas R. Hofstadter.

The section "The Soul of Martha, a Beast" was also the basis for the 1995 short film The Beast, which competed in the 1995 Cannes Film Festival short film competition.

The book was mentioned in a United States Tax Court case involving the author.
