= Reentrant =

Reentrant or re-entrant can refer to:

== Sciences ==
- Reentrancy (computing) in computer programming
- Reentrant mutex in computer science
- Reentry (neural circuitry) in neuroscience
- Concave polygon, AKA reentrant polygon
- Reentry into the atmosphere of an orbiting body

== Topography ==
- Re-entrant, a type of terrain feature commonly known as a draw.
- Salients, re-entrants and pockets in military tactics

== See also ==
- Reentrant dysrhythmia, a type of cardiac arrhythmia
- Reentrant tuning in music
