= Incremental research =

Research using numerous small projects

Incremental research refers to an orientation in research and publishing directed toward numerous smaller projects each making only a small step relative to already established scientific ideas, methods and knowledge. It is considered an opposite to exploration of radically new or untested ideas, questions or approaches. State of the art technological and massive studies in regular or mainstream science are however not considered incremental, as even a single such project or publication, while possibly not containing major original ideas, contains simultaneously numerous improvements and/or high to achieve excellence and precision.

Science and technology generally excel on building on existing knowledge. Incremental research is typically viewed as low risk, but low yield endeavor, as wasting human resources and landmark research opportunities. For example, major research grant institution European Research Council in its guides for authors and grant reviewers emphasizes higher value in high risk but high potential yield research (see also discussion). On a large scale, Thomas Kuhn in his philosophy of science sees scientific progress in a rather uneven, discontinuous manner, where main steps are made in works and periods bringing a paradigm shift.

Incremental research is often pursued as it entails shorter time frame to completion (and publication). Similarly, its course is more predictable and prone to planning. Since incremental proposals are more understandable to superiors, peers and reviewers, they tend to be reviewed or audited in shorter time. Publishing pressure (publish or perish), formal bibliometric criteria and many grant schemes require frequent publishing and timely success reporting, leaving lower opportunity to pursue high risk research with less regular output of major results. Publication strategies like salami slicing (see least publishable unit) are often pursued in this direction. "To remain in the research game requires productivity. Scientists typically achieve this by incremental contributions to established research directions." Non-incremental research is often perceived as more meaningful, for example in Schmidt et al 2020, the following benchmarking attitude is promoted:

"Methods research in stochastic optimization should focus on significant (conceptual, functional, performance) improvements — such as methods specifically suited for certain problem types, inner-loop parameter tuning or structurally novel methods. We make this claim not to discourage research but, quite on the contrary, to offer a motivation for more meaningful, non-incremental research."

Incremental publishing often entails duplicate or redundant material, scattered among different publication channels, putting an obstacle to assessment and grasp of entire research and burdening the publishing space.
