= The Neurosciences Institute =

American scientific research organization

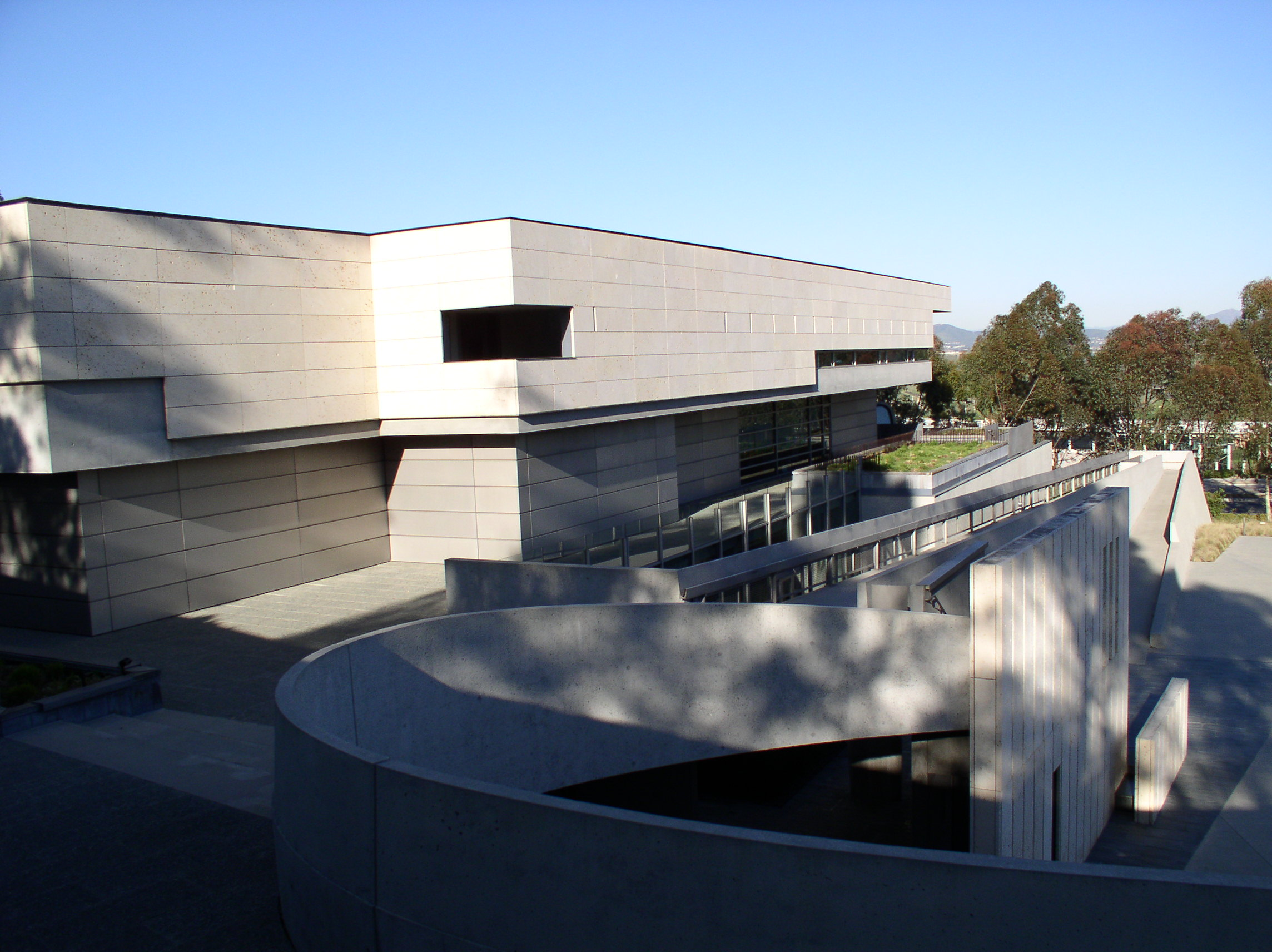
The Neurosciences Institute (NSI) occupied this building complex from 1995 to 2012.

The Neurosciences Institute (NSI) was a small, nonprofit scientific research organization that investigated basic issues in neuroscience. Active mainly between 1981 and 2012, the NSI sponsored theoretical, computational, and experimental work on consciousness, brain-inspired robotics, learning and memory, sensory processing, and motor control.

The NSI was founded by Nobel Laureate Gerald M. Edelman in 1981 in New York City. It remained an active research center until shortly before his death in 2014.

In 1993, the NSI moved to San Diego, California—first into temporary quarters and then, in 1995, into a newly constructed complex on the campus of The Scripps Research Institute (TSRI). Designed by the firm Tod Williams Billie Tsien Architects, the three-building complex received much acclaim for its Modernist style and especially for an auditorium that became a favored venue for music and performing arts in the area. In October 2012, plagued by financial problems and as part of a sharp contraction in its research efforts, NSI moved into leased space in an office building in the village of La Jolla, several miles from its old location. Its former home, including the auditorium, formally became part of TSRI.

The institute's size varied considerably over the years of its existence. At its peak, it included three dozen PhD-level research scientists (called "Fellows") and a comparable research support staff. Following the 2012 contraction, fewer than half a dozen Ph.D.-level research scientists remained. This number dwindled in the year preceding Edelman's death.

== History ==
NSI was established in 1981 as an independent entity on the campus of The Rockefeller University in New York City. In founding the institute, Edelman argued that the quest for fundamental understanding of brain functions was being impeded, at most existing institutions, by artificial barriers between scientific disciplines and by a reward structure that favored modest, incremental research rather than high-risk, high-payoff research. Edelman claimed that he would be able to break from this reward structure by securing private, unrestricted funding for research at NSI. However, he was mostly unsuccessful at this and NSI struggled financially throughout its existence.

In its very early years, the NSI sponsored conferences, workshops, and other activities for visiting scientists; these programs were generally organized around a focused research problem. More than 1000 scientists from 300 institutes and 24 countries visited the institute over its first two decades. NSI's financial problems in the decade before its 2012 contraction curtailed these activities, save for the Neurosciences Research Program meetings (see below).

In 1988, the NSI began its own program of research in theoretical and computational neurobiology. Carried out by a small group of resident Fellows, the program was designed to develop biologically based theories of higher brain functions. In 1993, following its relocation to San Diego, NSI added a program of experimental research, which would eventually include molecular, cellular, systems, and behavioral studies and would utilize flies, rodents, non-human primates, and humans.

In 2012, severe financial problems forced the NSI to vacate its San Diego complex, reduce its computational programs, and shut down its experimental and theoretical programs entirely. The three buildings constituting its former home were ceded to TSRI. What remained of NSI was housed, in the year immediately preceding Edelman's death, several miles away in rented office space in the La Jolla business district. NSI closed in 2018.

== Architecture ==
Between 1995 and 2012, the NSI occupied a three-building complex located on Torrey Pines Mesa in San Diego. It was bordered by TSRI to the west, the Sanford-Burnham Institute to the north, the University of California, San Diego to the south, and numerous biotechnology and pharmaceutical research companies to the east and in the immediate surrounding area. Following NSI's 2012 restructuring, the buildings were taken over by TSRI.

The NSI commissioned the buildings in the early 1990s. Edelman has said that, in selecting an architect, his goal was to find one who could realize his vision of a "scientific monastery" where creative study of the brain could be conducted with few constraining rules and unlimited opportunities for communication. The resulting complex, designed by Tod Williams and Billie Tsien, has been awarded numerous honors, including the Honor Award for Architecture from the American Institute of Architects in 1997. The structural engineering firm chosen for this project was Severud Associates.

One of the complex's three buildings is an auditorium designed to accommodate both scientific lectures and musical concerts. Noted acoustician Cyril Harris worked with the architects to create the 352-seat auditorium. Considered to be among the most acoustically impressive small performance halls in the United States, the auditorium was built with an original system of faceted, sound-dispersing plaster panels that cover its walls and ceiling, so that the same sound can be heard in every seat.

== Neurosciences Research Program (NRP) ==
Though it was founded in 1981, the NSI traces its origin to 1962. It was in that year that a small group of scientists from diverse backgrounds began to meet regularly to discuss basic ideas about how the brain works. Their motivation was the idea that traditional barriers between different scientific disciplines had to be broken down if complex brain functions were ever to be understood.

Led by Francis O. Schmitt, this informal collection of research scientists was organized as the Neurosciences Research Program (NRP) at Massachusetts Institute of Technology. Over the next two decades, and through over 250 meetings and 125 scientific publications, the NRP developed innovative formats for intellectual exchange and disseminated knowledge to the worldwide scientific community.

The central group today exists as an honorary society, whose members number no more than 36 at any one time and serve seven-year terms. Over the past four decades, 17 Nobel laureates have been members of the NRP.

The Neurosciences Institute itself developed from the NRP as an independent institution on the campus of The Rockefeller University in New York in 1981. The NRP moved from Boston to New York in 1983, and became part of the institute when it moved to San Diego in 1993.
