= Reentry (neural circuitry) =

Ongoing bidirectional signalling between two or more brain areas

Reentry is a neural structuring of the brain, which is characterized by the ongoing bidirectional exchange of signals along reciprocal axonal fibers linking two or more brain areas. It is hypothesized to allow for widely distributed groups of neurons to achieve integrated and synchronized firing, which is proposed to be a requirement for consciousness, as outlined by Gerald Edelman and Giulio Tononi in their book A Universe of Consciousness.

== See also ==
- Embodied philosophy
- Neural Darwinism
- Primary consciousness
- Secondary consciousness
