= The Moral Circle =

2025 book by Jeff Sebo

- First edition cover
- Author: Jeff Sebo
- Language: English
- Series: Norton Shorts
- Subject: Moral circle expansion
- Genre: Philosophy
- Publisher: W. W. Norton & Company
- Publication date: January 28, 2025
- Publication place: United States
- Media type: Print (hardcover), ebook
- Pages: 192
- ISBN: 978-1-324-06480-0
- OCLC: 1437529703
- Website: wwnorton.com

The Moral Circle: Who Matters, What Matters, and Why is a 2025 book by the American philosopher Jeff Sebo, published by W. W. Norton & Company. The book examines how humans determine which beings merit moral consideration and argues for expanding the moral circle beyond the human species. Sebo proposes a probabilistic precautionary approach in cases of uncertainty about moral status, and discusses the implications of this approach for animal ethics, artificial intelligence, and climate change.

Reviewers discussed the book's treatment of non-human animals, artificial intelligence, moral uncertainty, and human exceptionalism. Kirkus Reviews called it a "thoughtful unsettling of moral certainty", while reviewers in Science, The New York Times, and New Scientist discussed both its arguments and its limitations.

== Summary ==
The Moral Circle examines how humans decide which beings deserve moral consideration. The book opens with two contemporary examples: the Nonhuman Rights Project's unsuccessful legal case for the personhood of Happy, an elephant at the Bronx Zoo, and Google engineer Blake Lemoine's public claim that the LaMDA chatbot was conscious. Sebo uses these cases to discuss how moral and legal boundaries are tested in debates about animal ethics and artificial intelligence.

Early chapters examine philosophical debates about moral status, including theories that connect it to sentience, agency, or rationality. Sebo argues that the capacity to experience harm or benefit is sufficient for moral standing. Because it is often uncertain which beings meet that condition, he advocates a probabilistic precautionary approach that favors inclusion over exclusion. He applies this principle to non-human animals, possible artificial intelligences, and future beings affected by human actions.

Later chapters apply this reasoning to present practices. Sebo discusses research on pain and consciousness in cephalopods and insects, including octopuses and bees, and considers the moral implications of industries such as insect farming and aquaculture. He also discusses climate change, industrial agriculture, and artificial intelligence, arguing that these systems may affect large numbers of sentient or potentially sentient beings.

The book criticises human exceptionalism as a general moral rule, while allowing that limited preference for humans may sometimes be justified by practical considerations such as proximity and social relationships. Sebo presents a pluralistic ethical framework drawing on consequentialism, deontological ethics, and virtue ethics for decisions under uncertainty.

== Reception ==
W. W. Norton listed comments on the book by writers including Bryan Walsh, Peter Singer, Barbara J. King, and Carl Safina. Walsh described the book as timely in relation to artificial intelligence. Singer described it as a contribution to debates about expanding moral consideration. King noted Sebo's use of thought experiments, and Safina wrote that the book questions familiar ethical boundaries. The book was listed among the Next Big Idea Club's January 2025 recommended titles, selected by Susan Cain, Malcolm Gladwell, Adam Grant, and Daniel Pink. It was also included in The New Yorker's year-end list of the best books of 2025.

Kirkus Reviews described the book as a "thoughtful unsettling of moral certainty" and summarised Sebo's argument for extending moral concern to animals, insects, plants, microbes, and artificial intelligence.

In Science, Joshua C. Gellers reviewed The Moral Circle alongside Webb Keane's Animals, Robots, Gods. Gellers described Sebo's book as clear and careful in its treatment of agency, consciousness, and sentience as possible bases for moral status. He noted that Sebo's probabilistic framework differs from traditional moral intuitions and relational ethics, and questioned its reliance on contested philosophical ideas. Gellers also contrasted Sebo's systematic approach with Keane's more narrative style.

Mark Epstein, reviewing the book in The New York Times alongside Keane's Animals, Robots, Gods, described Sebo's book as didactic and prescriptive in tone. Epstein wrote that it sometimes presents its ideas assertively and that the frequent use of italics for emphasis can make it feel more like a lecture than a dialogue. He nevertheless recognised the importance of the book's questions about extending moral concern to non-human entities.

In New Scientist, Michael Marshall described The Moral Circle as a clear and rigorous study of moral consideration. He praised Sebo's focus on probability rather than certainty when evaluating consciousness, and found the thought experiments engaging. Marshall questioned whether the argument was timely given continuing struggles for human rights, but concluded that its appeal to empathy remained valuable.

== Publication history ==
The book was published in hardcover and ebook formats by W. W. Norton & Company on January 28, 2025. An audiobook version, narrated by Joel Richards and published by Tantor Media, was released on the same date.

== See also ==
- The Edge of Sentience – 2024 book by Jonathan Birch
- Animal consciousness
- Artificial consciousness
- Ethics of eating meat
- Ethics of uncertain sentience
- Insects in ethics
- Pain in animals
- Pain in amphibians
- Pain in cephalopods
- Pain in crustaceans
- Pain in fish
- Pain in invertebrates
- Philosophical zombie
- Problem of other minds
- Sentientism
- Speciesism
