= Jeff Sebo =

American philosopher (born 1983)

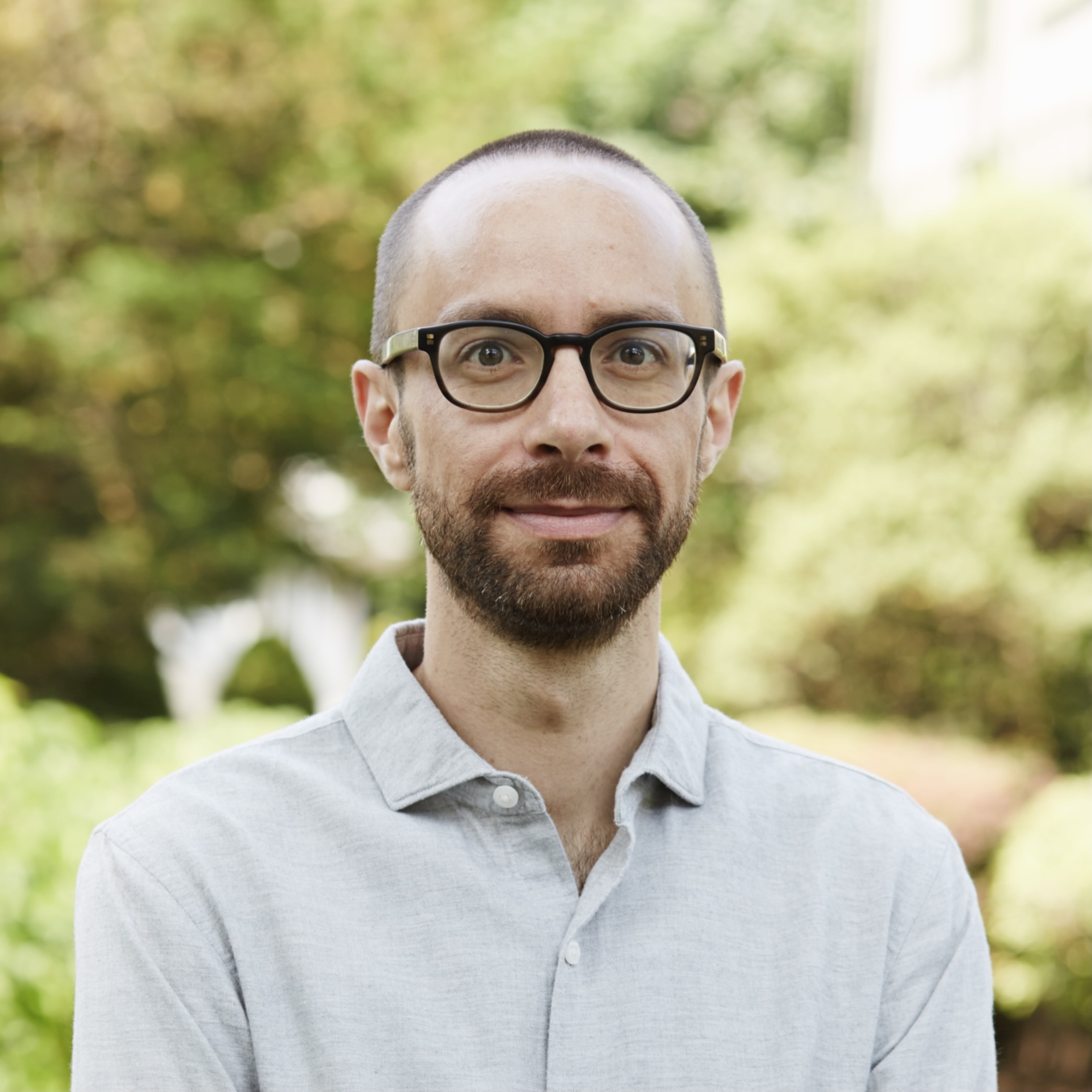
- Sebo in 2021
- Born: Jeffrey Raymond Sebo; February 24, 1983 (age 43)
- Spouse: Maryse Mitchell-Brody (m. 2014; div. 2022)

Education
- Education: Texas Christian University (B.A., 2005); New York University (PhD, 2011)
- Thesis: The Personal Is Political (2011)
- Doctoral advisor: J. David Velleman

Philosophical work
- Era: Contemporary philosophy
- Region: Western philosophy
- School: Analytic philosophy
- Institutions: New York University
- Main interests: Animal ethics; bioethics; environmental ethics; agency; well-being; moral status; moral philosophy; legal philosophy; political philosophy; ethics of activism; ethics of advocacy; ethics of philanthropy
- Notable works: Saving Animals, Saving Ourselves (2022); The Moral Circle: Who Matters, What Matters, and Why (2025)
- Notable ideas: Moral circle expansion; probability-weighted approach to uncertainty about sentience and moral status
- Website: jeffsebo.net

Jeffrey Raymond Sebo (born February 24, 1983) is an American philosopher. He is an associate professor of environmental studies at New York University (NYU), where he is also an affiliated professor of bioethics, medical ethics, philosophy, and law. He is the director of NYU's Center for Environmental and Animal Protection and Center for Mind, Ethics, and Policy, and co-director of its Wild Animal Welfare Program.

Sebo works on animal ethics, bioethics, environmental ethics, agency, well-being, moral status, moral philosophy, legal philosophy, political philosophy, the ethics of activism and advocacy, and the ethics of philanthropy. His books include Food, Animals and the Environment: An Ethical Approach (2018), co-authored with Christopher Schlottmann, Saving Animals, Saving Ourselves (2022), and The Moral Circle: Who Matters, What Matters, and Why (2025).

== Early life and education ==
Sebo is the son of Sheryl L. Sebo, an organist, and Eric J. Sebo, a systems special operations manager, of Plano, Texas.

He studied philosophy and sociology at Texas Christian University, graduating summa cum laude with a B.A. in 2005. While a student, he founded two animal rights groups in Fort Worth, Texas. One hosted movie nights and ran leafletting campaigns, and the other helped care for feral cats.

Sebo completed his PhD at New York University (NYU) in 2011. His dissertation, The Personal Is Political, was supervised by Derek Parfit, John Richardson, Sharon Street, and J. David Velleman, who chaired the committee.

== Career ==
In 2005, Sebo published his first academic article, "A Critique of the Kantian Theory of Indirect Duties to Animals", in Animal Liberation Philosophy & Policy.

After completing his PhD at NYU, Sebo held a postdoctoral fellowship there in animal and environmental studies until 2014, followed by a one-year postdoctoral position in bioethics at the National Institutes of Health. From 2015 to 2017, he was a research assistant professor of philosophy at the University of North Carolina at Chapel Hill, where he was associate director of the university's Parr Center for Ethics. He returned to NYU in 2017 as a clinical assistant professor in environmental studies, with affiliate roles in bioethics, medical ethics, and philosophy. He was promoted to clinical associate professor in 2020.

Sebo has described his engagement with effective altruism as an influence on his work, saying that its ideas and community helped him focus on farmed animal welfare, wild animal welfare, invertebrate welfare, and AI welfare.

Sebo's first book, Food, Animals and the Environment: An Ethical Approach, co-authored with Christopher Schlottmann, was published in 2018. In the same year, Sebo was among those who filed an amicus brief in support of granting legal personhood to chimpanzees. Chimpanzee Rights: The Philosophers' Brief was published by Routledge in 2018. Sebo was one of 13 authors, with Kristin Andrews, Gary L. Comstock, G. K. D. Crozier, Sue Donaldson, Andrew Fenton, Tyler M. John, L. Syd M. Johnson, Robert C. Jones, Will Kymlicka, Letitia Meynell, Nathan Nobis, and David Pena-Guzman. Selbo has also co-authored several papers arguing that the emerging field of AI welfare needs to be taken seriously.

Beginning in 2018, Sebo was the founding director of NYU's M.A. in animal studies. The program was later integrated into the Center for Environmental and Animal Protection (CEAP), founded in 2018 and directed by Dale Jamieson.

NYU launched its Mind, Ethics, and Policy Program in 2022, with Sebo as director. The university also launched its Wild Animal Welfare Program that year, co-directed by Sebo and Becca Franks. In 2023, Sebo became an associate professor and deputy director of CEAP. The Center for Mind, Ethics, and Policy (CMEP), of which Sebo was founding director, was launched in 2024 with endowments from The Navigation Fund and Macroscopic Ventures. Sebo became director of CEAP in 2024, after Jamieson had retired from the NYU faculty in 2022. Franks became director of the animal studies M.A. program. In 2025, Sebo became the principal investigator of NYU's Wildlife Inclusive Local Development Lab.

As of 2025, Sebo is an associate professor of environmental studies and an affiliated professor of bioethics, medical ethics, philosophy, and law. He is director of CEAP and CMEP, and co-director of the Wild Animal Welfare Program.

In 2024, Sebo, Jonathan Birch, and Kristin Andrews launched the New York Declaration on Animal Consciousness. In the same year, Sebo was included in Vox's "Future Perfect 50", a list of people working on solutions to present and future problems.

Sebo's first sole-authored book, Saving Animals, Saving Ourselves, was published by Oxford University Press in 2022. His second, The Moral Circle: Who Matters, What Matters, and Why, was published in 2025 by W. W. Norton. It appeared on The New Yorker's year-end best books list.

=== Nonprofit and advisory work ===
Sebo has been a board member of Minding Animals International since 2014, a mentor and contributing writer at Sentient Media since 2020, and a senior research affiliate at the Legal Priorities Project since 2021. He was an executive committee member of the Animals & Society Institute from 2012 to 2020, a board member of Animal Charity Evaluators from 2015 to 2021, and an advisory member of the Sentience Institute from 2018 to 2020.

== Personal life ==
In 2014, Sebo married Maryse Mitchell-Brody, a psychotherapist, in a ceremony officiated by a Universal Life minister. The couple lived in Brooklyn, New York, with their dog Smoky until their separation and divorce in 2022.

== Selected publications ==
- ——; Mogensen, Andreas L. (November 10, 2025). Warburton, Nigel (ed.). "The Ant You Can Save: Should We Simply Assume That All Animals Can Feel Pain and Are of Moral Concern? Or Is That Taking Things Too Far?". Aeon.
- —— (2025). The Moral Circle. W. W. Norton & Company. ISBN 978-1-324-06480-0.
- —— (July 5, 2022), "Wild Animals", The Routledge Companion to Environmental Ethics, New York: Routledge, pp. 63–71, doi:10.4324/9781315768090-8, ISBN 978-1-315-76809-0
- —— (2022). Saving Animals, Saving Ourselves. Oxford University Press. ISBN 978-0-19-086101-8.
- —— (January 15, 2020). "All We Owe to Animals". Aeon.
- —— (April 7, 2018). "Should Chimpanzees Be Considered 'Persons'?". The New York Times. ISSN 0362-4331.
- Andrews, Kristin; Comstock, Gary L.; Crozier, G. K. D.; Donaldson, Sue; Fenton, Andrew; John, Tyler M.; Johnson, L. Syd M.; Jones, Robert C.; Kymlicka, Will; Meynell, Letitia; Nobis, Nathan; Pena-Guzman, David; —— (2018). Chimpanzee Rights: The Philosophers' Brief (PDF). Abingdon: Routledge. ISBN 978-1-138-61866-4.
- Schlottmann, Christopher; —— (2018). Food, Animals and the Environment: An Ethical Approach. Abingdon: Routledge. ISBN 978-1-138-80112-7.
