= Anthropectomy =

Withholding of human qualities from non-human animals

Anthropectomy refers to the withholding of human qualities from non-human animals. It is conceptually opposed to anthropomorphism, which refers to the attribution of human characteristics to animals. Anthropectomy describes an error in animal cognition research, of assuming animals don't share certain human qualities with humans. Both anthropectomy and anthropomorphism are bias shown in animal cognition research. They are highly debated topics in this field, and can influence how a researcher conducts their research which is why both are typically avoided.

== Etymology ==
The term anthropectomy is derived from the Greek words anthropos (ἄνθρωπος), meaning "human," and ektomia (ἐκτομή), meaning "to cut out".

== Uses ==
The term anthropectomy was introduced by philosophers Kristin Andrews and Brian Huss. The article in which they introduce anthropectomy was published in 2014. It appears in a variety of contexts in the literature. In some cases, it refers to the tendency to deny non-human animals human-like qualities without adequate justification. In other contexts, it refers more specifically to a cognitive bias in humans, such as human exceptionalism or anthropofabulation, that results in the systematic exclusion of animals from traits considered human.

Other terms for anthropectomy include anthropodenial, coined by Frans de Waal, and reverse anthropomorphism, used by Maxine Sheets-Johnstone, both referring to the same error of denying human-like traits in non-human animals.

== In animal cognitive research ==
In the context of hypothesis testing, anthropectomy corresponds to a Type-II error or false negative: failing to recognize a trait in an animal when the animal does, in fact, possess it. This is contrasted with anthropomorphism, which is associated with a Type-I error or false positive: wrongly attributing a trait the animal does not have. Anthropectomy may occur when a null hypothesis assumes that animals lack certain cognitive or emotional traits that are considered uniquely human. When such hypotheses are not rejected, the resulting conclusions often go beyond agnosticism and assert the absence of the trait. This shifts the research from cautious skepticism to unjustified denial.

Critics argue that anthropectic thinking may stifle scientific progress by prematurely ruling out complex animal capacities. Researchers are opening up to the idea of attributing human psychological abilities to nonhuman animals. However, a majority of researchers can't get past the negative connotation of the words when studying animal cognition.

According to philosopher Devin Sanchez Curry, an asymmetry exists between anthropomorphic bias and anthropectic bias, as humans are systematically inclined toward anthropomorphism. Some scholars advocate for a level epistemological playing field, where neither anthropomorphism nor anthropectomy is the default. An author Steven Wagschal a professor at Indiana University, who wrote a book titled, Minding Animals in the Old Way and New Worlds: A Cognitive Historical Analysis. In which he mentions a specific type of bias in animal cognitive research. Wagschal states one of the best examples of consistent anthropectomy is found in fish. Even though humans are more inclined to anthropomorphism species like fish tend to be not be because, it's a lot harder to interact with them because they live underwater in a different environment than humans. Humans tend to anthropomorphize animals that we see similar to ourselves. This has little to do with differences in cognitive ability, but more so, which animals humans can relate to the most.

== See also ==
- Anthropocentrism
- Speciesism
