= Letitia Meynell =

Canadian philosopher

External audio
- Knowing Animals
- Episode 219: Gendering animals with Letitia Meynell; Meynell discusses her 2021 paper "Gendering Animals" on Knowing Animals

Letitia Meynell is a Canadian philosopher who is a Professor of Philosophy at Dalhousie University. Her work concerns philosophy of science, epistemology, feminist philosophy, and human/animal relationships.

== Career ==
Meynell read a BA (Hons) in Theatre at York University (1989-93), and then a MA in Philosophy at the University of Calgary (1995-8). She submitted her thesis, Picture hooks: prelude to an aesthetic epistemololgy (which was supervised by Brian Grant), in January 1998. She went on to read for a PhD in Philosophy at the University of Western Ontario. Her thesis, Representing, imagining and understanding: The aesthetics and epistemology of images in science, was supervised by Kathleen Okruhlik; the other committee members were Patrick Maynard and Wayne Myrvold. Kendall Walton was the external examiner.

After completing her PhD and working as an instructor at Western Ontario, Meynell took on a limited-term assistant professorship at Dalhousie University's Department of Philosophy, with a cross appointment in the Gender and Women's Studies Programme. She took on a tenure track assistant professorship at Dalhousie in 2008. Shortly afterwards, Meynell's first book, Embodiment and Agency, was published by Penn State University Press. This collection was co-edited with Sue Campbell and Susan Sherwin.

Meynell was subsequently promoted to associate professor and full professor. Her second book, Thought Experiments in Science, Philosophy and the Arts, was co-edited with Melanie Frappier and James Robert Brown and published by Routledge in 2012. Her third was Chimpanzee Rights: The Philosophers' Brief, which was co-authored with Kristin Andrews, Gary Comstock, G. K. D. Crozier, Sue Donaldson, Andrew Fenton, Tyler M. John, L. Syd M. Johnson, Robert Jones, Will Kymlicka, Nathan Nobis, David Peña-Guzmán, and Jeff Sebo.

== Selected publications ==
- Letitia Meynell (2008). "Why Feynman diagrams represent". International Studies in the Philosophy of Science 22 (1): 39-59. doi:10.1080/02698590802280902.
- Sue Campbell, Letitia Meynell, and Susan Sherwin, eds. (2009). Embodiment and Agency. Penn State University Press.
- Melanie Frappier, Letitia Meynell, and James Robert Brown, eds. (2012). Thought Experiments in Science, Philosophy and the Arts. Routledge.
- Letitia Meynell (2014). "Imagination and insight: a new account of the content of thought experiments". Synthese 191 (17): 4149-68. doi:10.1007/s11229-014-0519-x.
- Kristin Andrews, Gary Comstock, G. K. D. Crozier, Sue Donaldson, Andrew Fenton, Tyler M. John, L. Syd M. Johnson, Robert Jones, Will Kymlicka, Letitia Meynell, Nathan Nobis, David Peña-Guzmán, and Jeff Sebo (2019). Chimpanzee Rights: The Philosophers' Brief. Routledge.
- Letitia Meynell and Andrew Lopez (2021). "Gendering animals". Synthese 199 (1-2): 4287-311. doi:10.1007/s11229-020-02979-4.
