= Sue Donaldson =

Canadian writer and philosopher (born 1962)

- Born: 1962 (age 63–64)
- Spouse: Will Kymlicka
- Writing career
- Pen name: Susan Cliffe
- Notable work: Zoopolis: A Political Theory of Animal Rights (2011)
- Notable awards: Canadian Philosophical Association's Book Prize

Sue Donaldson (also known as Susan Cliffe; born 1962) is a Canadian writer and philosopher. She is a research fellow affiliated with the Department of Philosophy at Queen's University, where she is the co-founder of the Animals in Philosophy, Politics, Law and Ethics (APPLE) research cluster.

== Biography ==
Donaldson was born in Ottawa in 1962, and has lived most of her life in Eastern Ontario. She currently lives in Kingston, Ontario with her husband, Will Kymlicka.

== Writing ==
Donaldson is a philosopher of animal rights. She published a vegan cookbook, Foods That Don't Bite Back, in 2003. She has also co-authored numerous articles in peer-reviewed academic journals on the topic of animal rights.In 2004, she published a young adult novel, Threads of Deceit, under the name Susan Cliffe. This monograph is a historical fiction and mystery novel set in nineteenth century Upper Canada.

She published Zoopolis: A Political Theory of Animal Rights, co-written with Will Kymlicka, in 2011. In this book, as well as their other co-authored work on animal ethics, Donaldson and Kymlicka argue for a group-differentiated political conception of animal rights. Drawing upon citizenship theory, they argue that although all animals should be protected by the same fundamental rights, individual animals should have different rights (and different responsibilities) depending on their group membership. Animals who form a part of mixed human/animal society (domesticated animals) should be conceived of as citizens, while animals who are reliant upon the mixed society without being a part of it (liminal animals) should be conceived of as denizens. Wild animals, who live wholly or mostly separately from the mixed human/animal society, should be conceived of as sovereign over their own territory. Intervention to reduce wild animal suffering would accordingly be acceptable if compatible with respect for their sovereignty.

In 2025, Sue Donaldson published, together with Will Kymlicka, the book Animals and the Right to Politics, in which they critique the prevailing “minimal animal” paradigm found in traditional animal theories and argue in favor of an approach that seeks to recognize and support the political agency of animals as minded social beings.

== Awards ==
In 2013, she won the Canadian Philosophical Association's Book Prize, with Will Kymlicka, for their book Zoopolis.

== Selected publications ==
- Foods That Don't Bite Back: Vegan Cooking Made Simple. Vancouver: Whitecap Books, 2003.
- Thread of Deceit (as Susan Cliffe). Toronto: Sumach Press, 2004.
- Zoopolis: A Political Theory of Animal Rights. Oxford: Oxford University Press, 2011. (With Will Kymlicka)
- Chimpanzee Rights: The Philosophers' Brief, Routledge, 2018. (With Kristin Andrews, Gary Comstock, G. K. D. Crozier, Andrew Fenton, Tyler John, L. Syd M Johnson, Robert Jones, Will Kymlicka, Letitia Meynell, Nathan Nobis, David Pena-Guzman, and Jeff Sebo)
- Animals and the Right to Politics. Oxford: Oxford University Press, 2025. (With Will Kymlicka)
