= Pain in cephalopods =

Examples of cephalopds

The common octopus
(Octopus vulgaris)

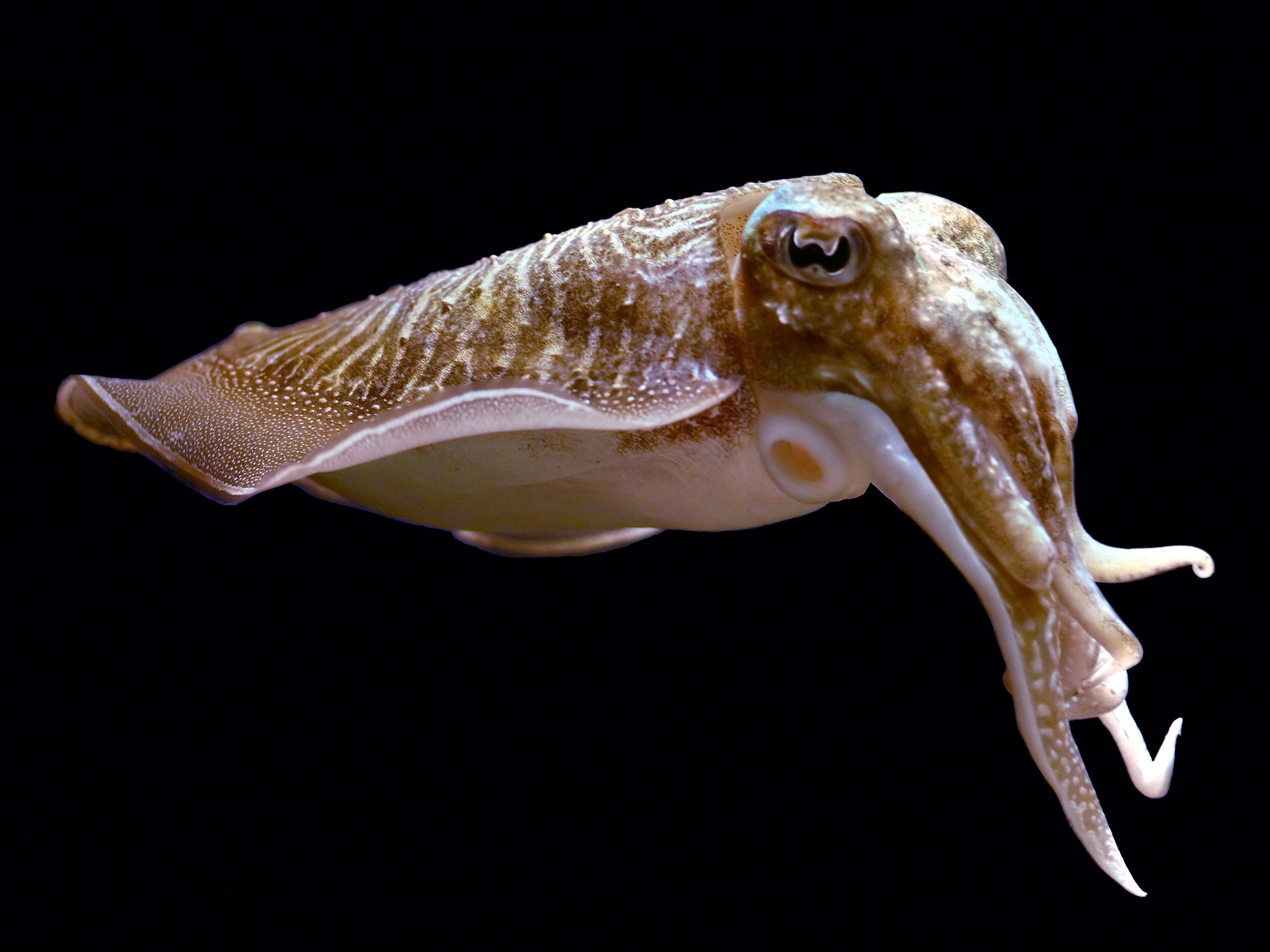
The common cuttlefish
(Sepia officinalis)

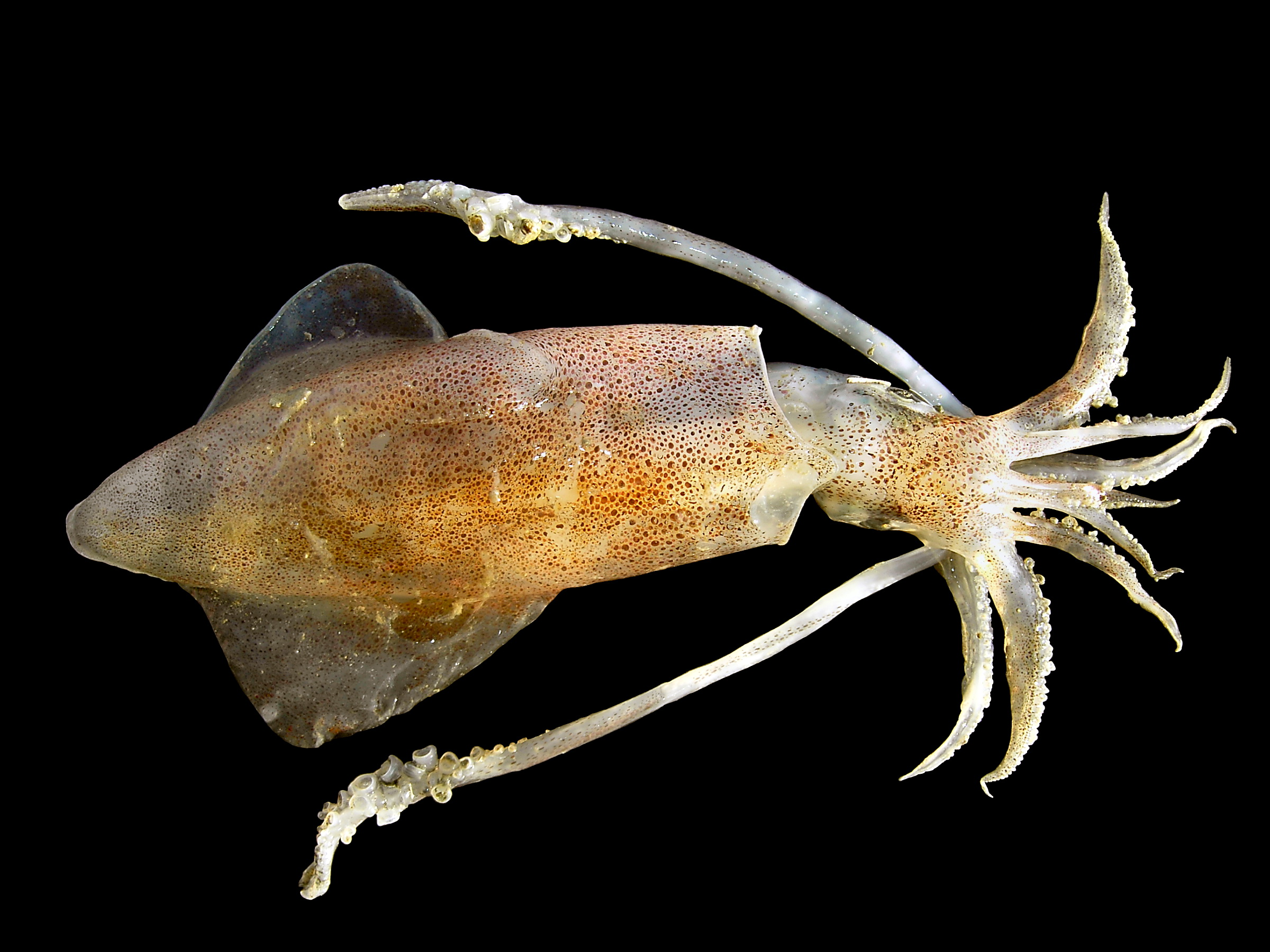
The common squid
(Loligo vulgaris)

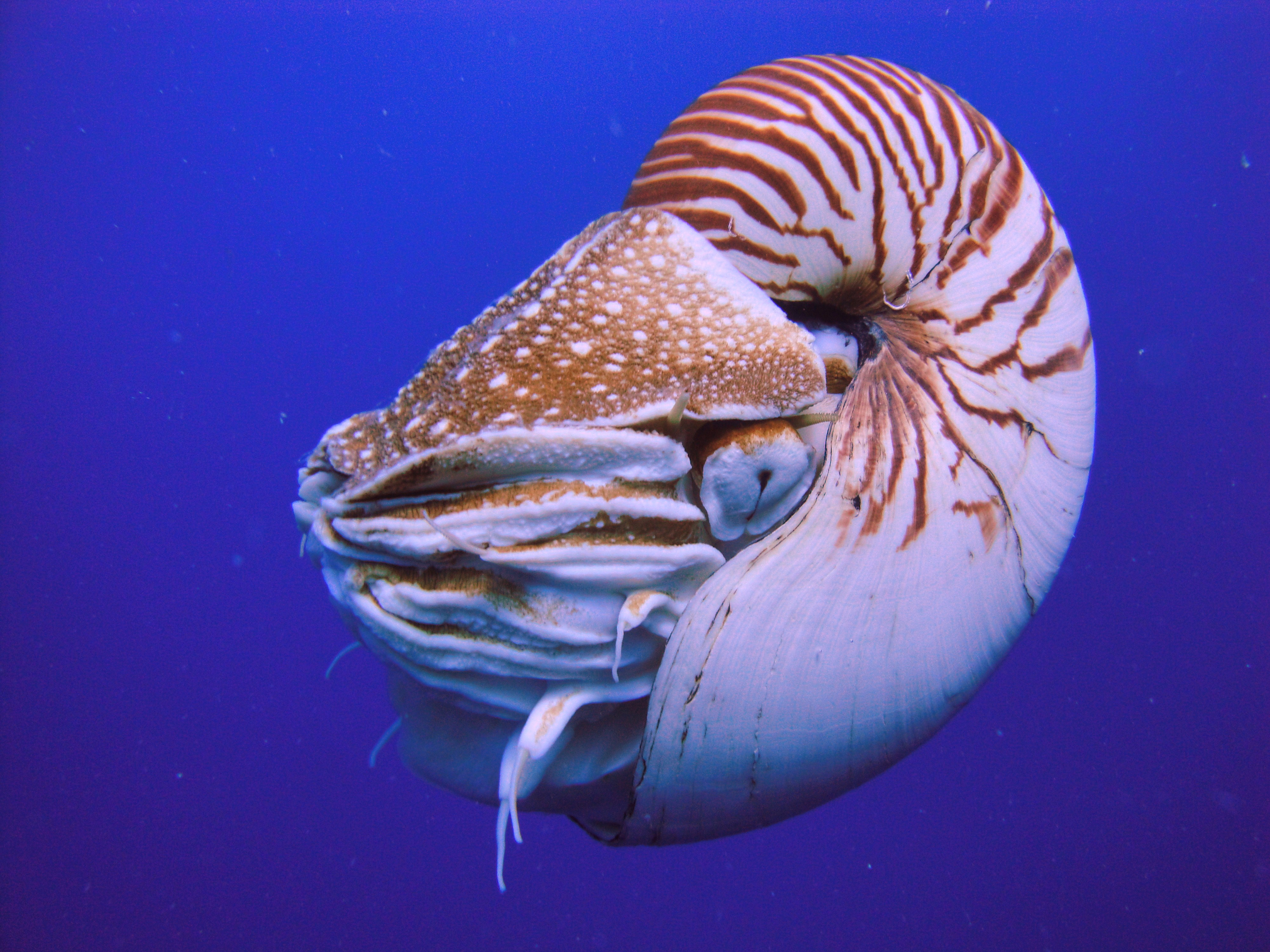
The Palau nautilus
(Nautilus belauensis)

Pain in cephalopods is a contentious issue. Pain is a complex mental state, with a distinct perceptual quality but also associated with suffering, which is an emotional state. Because of this complexity, the presence of pain in non-human animals, or another human for that matter, cannot be determined unambiguously using observational methods, but the conclusion that animals experience pain is often inferred on the basis of likely presence of phenomenal consciousness which is deduced from comparative brain physiology as well as physical and behavioural reactions.

Cephalopods are complex invertebrates, often considered to be more "advanced" than other invertebrates. They fulfill several criteria proposed as indicating that non-human animals may be capable of perceiving pain. These fulfilled criteria include having a suitable nervous system and sensory receptors, opioid receptors, reduced responses to noxious stimuli when given analgesics and local anaesthetics used for vertebrates, physiological changes to noxious stimuli, displaying protective motor reactions, exhibiting avoidance learning and making trade-offs between noxious stimulus avoidance and other motivational requirements. Furthermore, it has been argued that pain may be only one component of suffering in cephalopods; others potentially include fear, anxiety, stress and distress.

Most animal welfare legislation protects only vertebrates. However, cephalopods have a special position among invertebrates in terms of their perceived ability to experience pain, which is reflected by some national and international legislation protecting them during research.

If cephalopods feel pain, there are ethical and animal welfare implications including the consequences of exposure to pollutants, practices involving commercial fishing, aquaculture and for cephalopods used in scientific research or which are eaten. Because of the possibility that cephalopods are capable of perceiving pain, it has been suggested that "precautionary principles" should be followed with respect to human interactions and consideration of these invertebrates.

== Background ==
Extant cephalopods are divided into two subclasses, the Coleoidea (cuttlefish, squid, and octopus) and Nautiloidea (nautiluses). They are molluscs, meaning they are related to slugs, snails and bivalves. Cephalopods are widely regarded as the most intelligent of the invertebrates. They have well-developed senses and large brains, and are considered by some to be "advanced invertebrates" or an "exceptional invertebrate class". About 700 living species of cephalopods have been identified.

The nervous system of cephalopods is the most complex of all the invertebrates and their brain-to-body-mass ratio falls between that of endothermic and ectothermic vertebrates. The brain is protected in a cartilaginous cranium.

The possibility that non-human animals may be capable of perceiving pain has a long history. Initially, this was based around theoretical and philosophical argument, but more recently has turned to scientific investigation.

=== Philosophy ===
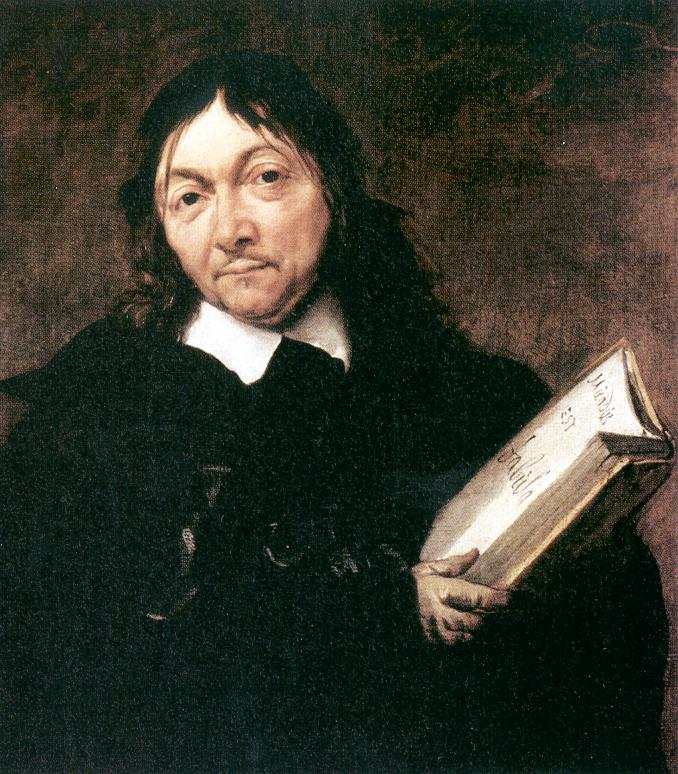
René Descartes

The idea that non-human animals might not feel pain goes back to the 17th-century French philosopher, René Descartes, who argued that animals do not experience pain and suffering because they lack consciousness.

In 1789, the British philosopher and social reformist, Jeremy Bentham, addressed in his book An Introduction to the Principles of Morals and Legislation the issue of our treatment of animals with the following often quoted words: "The question is not, Can they reason? nor, can they talk? but, Can they suffer?"

Peter Singer, a bioethicist and author of Animal Liberation published in 1975, suggested that consciousness is not necessarily the key issue: just because animals have smaller brains, or are 'less conscious' than humans, does not mean that they are not capable of feeling pain. He goes on further to argue that we do not assume newborn infants, people suffering from neurodegenerative brain diseases or people with learning disabilities experience less pain than we would.

Bernard Rollin, the principal author of two U.S. federal laws regulating pain relief for animals, writes that researchers remained unsure into the 1980s as to whether animals experience pain, and veterinarians trained in the U.S. before 1989 were taught to simply ignore animal pain. In his interactions with scientists and other veterinarians, Rollin was regularly asked to "prove" that animals are conscious, and to provide "scientifically acceptable" grounds for claiming that they feel pain.

Continuing into the 1990s, discussions were further developed on the roles that philosophy and science had in understanding animal cognition and mentality. In subsequent years, it was argued there was strong support for the suggestion that some animals (most likely amniotes) have at least simple conscious thoughts and feelings and that the view animals feel pain differently to humans is now a minority view.

=== Scientific investigation ===
Cambridge Declaration on Consciousness (2012)

The absence of a neocortex does not appear to preclude an organism from experiencing affective states. Convergent evidence indicates that non-human animals have the neuroanatomical, neurochemical, and neurophysiological substrates of conscious states along with the capacity to exhibit intentional behaviors. Consequently, the weight of evidence indicates that humans are not unique in possessing the neurological substrates that generate consciousness. Non-human animals, including all mammals and birds, and many other creatures, including octopuses [which are cephalopods], also possess these neurological substrates.

In the 20th and 21st centuries, there were many scientific investigations of pain in non-human animals.

==== Mammals ====
At the turn of the century, studies were published showing that arthritic rats self-select analgesic opiates. In 2014, the veterinary Journal of Small Animal Practice published an article on the recognition of pain which started – "The ability to experience pain is universally shared by all mammals..." and in 2015, it was reported in the science journal Pain, that several mammalian species (rat, mouse, rabbit, cat and horse) adopt a facial expression in response to a noxious stimulus that is consistent with the expression of humans in pain.

==== Birds ====
At the same time as the investigations using arthritic rats, studies were published showing that birds with gait abnormalities self-select for a diet that contains the painkiller carprofen. In 2005, it was written "Avian pain is likely analogous to pain experienced by most mammals" and in 2014, "...it is accepted that birds perceive and respond to noxious stimuli and that birds feel pain".

==== Fish ====
Whether fish are able to perceive pain is contentious. However, teleost fishes have a suitable nervous system and sensory receptors, opioid receptors and reduced responses to noxious stimuli when given analgesics and local anaesthetics, physiological changes to noxious stimuli, displaying protective motor reactions, exhibiting avoidance learning and making trade-offs between noxious stimulus avoidance and other motivational requirements.

==== Reptiles and amphibians ====
Veterinary articles have been published stating both reptiles and amphibians experience pain in a way analogous to humans, and that analgesics are effective in these two classes of vertebrates.

==== Argument by analogy ====
In 2012, the American philosopher Gary Varner reviewed the research literature on pain in animals. His findings are summarised in the following table.

Argument by analogy
Property
Property	Fish	Amphibians	Reptiles	Birds	Mammals
Has nociceptors	✓	✓	✓	✓	✓
Has brain	✓	✓	✓	✓	✓
Nociceptors and brain linked	✓	? (Note: But see) / ✓	? (Note: But see) / ✓	? / ✓	✓
Has endogenous opioids	✓	✓	✓	✓	✓
Analgesics affect responses	✓	? (Note: But see)	? (Note: But see)	✓	✓
Response to damaging stimuli similar to humans	✓	✓	✓	✓	✓

=== Notes ===
Arguing by analogy, Varner claims that any animal which exhibits the properties listed in the table could be said to experience pain. On that basis, he concludes that all vertebrates probably experience pain, but invertebrates, apart from cephalopods probably do not experience pain.

== The experience of pain ==
Although there are numerous definitions of pain, almost all involve two key components.

First, nociception is required. This is the ability to detect noxious stimuli which evoke a reflex response that rapidly moves the entire animal, or the affected part of its body, away from the source of the stimulus. The concept of nociception does not imply any adverse, subjective "feeling" – it is a reflex action. An example in humans would be the rapid withdrawal of a finger that has touched something hot – the withdrawal occurs before any sensation of pain is actually experienced.

The second component is the experience of "pain" itself, or suffering – the internal, emotional interpretation of the nociceptive experience. Again in humans, this is when the withdrawn finger begins to hurt, moments after the withdrawal. Pain is therefore a private, emotional experience. Pain cannot be directly measured in other animals, including other humans; responses to putatively painful stimuli can be measured, but not the experience itself. To address this problem when assessing the capacity of other species to experience pain, argument-by-analogy is used. This is based on the principle that if an animal responds to a stimulus in a similar way to ourselves, it is likely to have had an analogous experience.

A definition of "pain" widely accepted by scientific investigators is "an unpleasant sensory and emotional experience associated with actual or potential tissue damage, or described in terms of such damage".

=== Nociception ===
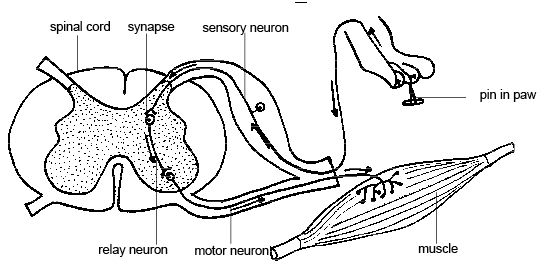
Nociception: The reflex arc of a dog with a pin in her paw. Note there is no communication to the brain, but the paw is withdrawn by nervous impulses generated by the spinal cord. There is no conscious interpretation of the stimulus by the dog.

Nociception has been defined as "the detection of stimuli that are injurious or would be if sustained or repeated". It initiates immediate withdrawal of limbs or appendages, or the entire body, and therefore has clear adaptive advantages. Nociception usually involves the transmission of a signal along a chain of nerve fibers from the site of a noxious stimulus at the periphery to the spinal cord and brain. In vertebrates, this process evokes a reflex arc response generated at the spinal cord and not involving the brain, such as flinching or withdrawal of a limb. Nociception is found, in one form or another, across all major animal taxa. Nociception can be observed using modern imaging techniques; and a physiological and behavioral response to nociception can be detected.

=== Emotional pain ===
Sometimes a distinction is made between "physical pain" and "emotional" or "psychological pain". Emotional pain is the pain experienced in the absence of physical trauma, e.g. the pain experienced by humans after the loss of a loved one, or the break-up of a relationship. It has been argued that only primates and humans can feel "emotional pain", because they are the only animals that have a neocortex – a part of the brain's cortex considered to be the "thinking area". However, research has provided evidence that monkeys, dogs, cats and birds can show signs of emotional pain and display behaviours associated with depression during painful experience, i.e. lack of motivation, lethargy, anorexia, unresponsiveness to other animals.

=== Physical pain ===
A definition of pain widely accepted and used by scientists is "an unpleasant sensory and emotional experience associated with actual or potential tissue damage, or described in terms of such damage". The nerve impulses of the nociception response may be conducted to the brain thereby registering the location, intensity, quality and unpleasantness of the stimulus. This subjective component of pain involves conscious awareness of both the sensation and the unpleasantness (the aversive, negative affect). The brain processes underlying conscious awareness of the unpleasantness (suffering), are not well understood.

There have been several published lists of criteria for establishing whether non-human animals are capable of perceiving pain, e.g. Some criteria that may indicate the potential of another species, including cephalopods, to feel pain include:

1. Has a suitable nervous system and sensory receptors
2. Has opioid receptors and shows reduced responses to noxious stimuli when given analgesics and local anaesthetics
3. Physiological changes to noxious stimuli
4. Displays protective motor reactions that might include reduced use of an affected area such as limping, rubbing, holding or autotomy
5. Shows avoidance learning
6. Shows trade-offs between noxious stimulus avoidance and other motivational requirements
7. High cognitive ability and sentience

== Adaptive value ==
The adaptive value of nociception is obvious; an organism detecting a noxious stimulus immediately withdraws the limb, appendage or entire body from the noxious stimulus and thereby avoids further (potential) injury. However, a characteristic of pain (in mammals at least) is that pain can result in hyperalgesia (a heightened sensitivity to noxious stimuli) and allodynia (a heightened sensitivity to non-noxious stimuli). When this heightened sensitisation occurs, the adaptive value is less clear. First, the pain arising from the heightened sensitisation can be disproportionate to the actual tissue damage caused. Second, the heightened sensitisation may also become chronic, persisting well beyond the tissues healing. This can mean that rather than the actual tissue damage causing pain, it is the pain due to the heightened sensitisation that becomes the concern. This means the sensitisation process is sometimes termed maladaptive. It is often suggested hyperalgesia and allodynia assist organisms to protect themselves during healing, but experimental evidence to support this has been lacking.

In 2014, the adaptive value of sensitisation due to injury was tested using the predatory interactions between longfin inshore squid (Doryteuthis pealeii) and black sea bass (Centropristis striata) which are natural predators of this squid. If injured squid are targeted by a bass, they began their defensive behaviours sooner (indicated by greater alert distances and longer flight initiation distances) than uninjured squid. If anaesthetic (1% ethanol and MgCl_{2}) is administered prior to the injury, this prevents the sensitisation and blocks the behavioural effect. The authors claim this study is the first experimental evidence to support the argument that nociceptive sensitisation is actually an adaptive response to injuries.

== Research findings ==
=== Peripheral nervous system ===
A moving octopus. Note the co-ordination of the arms.

A science-based report from the University of British Columbia to the Canadian Federal Government has been quoted as stating "The cephalopods, including octopus and squid, have a remarkably well developed nervous system and may well be capable of experiencing pain and suffering."

==== Nociceptors ====
The discovery of nociceptors in cephalopods has occurred relatively recently. In 2011, it was written that nociceptors had yet to be described in any cephalopod. However, in 2013, nociceptors responsive to mechanical and electrical stimuli, but not thermal stimuli, were described in the longfin inshore squid (Doryteuthis pealeii) (note – it is highly unlikely that squid encounter temperatures greater than 30 °C making it very improbable that the nervous system will have evolved nociceptors to detect such high temperatures.) This study also provided evidence that these receptors, as in vertebrates, undergo both short-term and long-term sensitization (30 min and 24 h, respectively). Similarly, low-threshold mechanoreceptors and cells considered to be nociceptors in the algae octopus (Abdopus aculeatus) are sensitised for at least 24 hrs after a crushing injury.

==== Nerve fibres ====
Both the arms and the mantle contain nervous tissue that conduct nociceptive information to the higher processing areas of the CNS.

Numerous studies have described the existence of neural tissue paths that connects the peripheral areas of cephalopods to their CNS. However it is unclear if specific pain pathways are among these.

In octopuses, the large optic lobes and the arms' nervous system are located outside the brain complex. The optic lobes contain 120 to 180 million neurons and the nervous system of the arms contains two-thirds of the total 500 million neurons in the nervous system.

==== Brain ====
The octopus central brain contains 40 to 45 million cells. The brain-to-body mass ratio of the octopus is the highest of all the invertebrates and larger than that of most fish and reptiles (i.e. vertebrates). However, scientists have noted that brain size is not necessarily related to the complexity of its function.

Octopuses have centralized brains located inside a cartilaginous capsule surrounding the oesophagus. It is divided into approximately 40 specialized areas and lobes that are arranged hierarchically; these include the sub- and supra-oesophageal masses, and the magnocellular, buccal, inferior frontal, vertical, basal, optic, peduncle, and olfactory lobes. The lobe's functions include learning, memory, processing information from the various sensory modalities, control of motor responses and the blood system. The vertical and frontal lobe complexes, unique among invertebrates, have vertebrate-like properties and are dedicated to learning and memory. It has been suggested the vertical lobe system processes information related to pain.

The nautilus brain lacks the vertical lobe complex and is therefore simpler than that of the coleoids, however, they still exhibit rapid learning (within 10 trials), and have both short- and long-term memory (as found in operant studies of cuttlefish).

In 2011, it was written that it was not known where in the brain cephalopods process nociceptive information meaning that evidence for nociception is exclusively behavioural.

=== Opioid system ===
The four main opioid receptor types (delta, kappa, mu, and NOP) are found in vertebrates; they are highly conserved in this taxon and are found even in primitive jawless fishes. The endogenous system of opioid receptors is well known for its analgesic potential in vertebrates. Enkephalins come in two forms, met-enkephalin and leu-enkephalin, which are involved in regulating nociception in the vertebrate body as they bind to the body's opioid receptors.

Enkephalin-like peptides have been found in neurones of the palliovisceral lobe of the brain in the common octopus, and met-enkephalin receptors as well as delta opioid receptors in the mantle, arms, gut and vena cava of various octopus species. Leu-enkephalin and delta receptors have been found in the mantle, arms and other tissues in Amphioctopus fangsiao.

==== Effects of naloxone ====
Naloxone is an μ-opioid receptor antagonist which, in vertebrates and some other invertebrates, negates the effects of opioids. The substance has a similar reversal effect in the California two-spot octopus (Octopus bimaculatus).

=== Effects of analgesics and anaesthetics ===
Cephalopod veterinary medicine sometimes uses the same analgesics and anaesthetics used in mammals and other vertebrates.

If anaesthetic (1% ethanol and MgCl_{2}) is administered prior to a crushing injury, this prevents nociceptive sensitisation.

General anaesthesia in cephalopods has been achieved with a large range of substances, including isoflurane. Benzocaine is considered to be an effective anaesthetic for the giant Pacific octopus (Enteroctopus dofleini). Magnesium hydrochloride, clove oil, carbon dioxide and ethanol are among the substances used for anaesthesia of cephalopods.

=== Behavioural responses ===
==== Protective ====
Many animals, including some octopuses, autotomise limbs when these are injured. This is considered to be a nociceptive behaviour. After receiving a crushing injury to an arm, algae octopuses autotomise the affected arm and show wound protective behaviours such as wrapping other arms around the wounded arm. These protective responses continue for at least 24 hours. In the long-term, they also show heightened sensitisation at the site of the injury and a reduced threshold to showing escape responses. The curled octopus (Eledone cirrhosa) also shows protective responses to injury. These long-term changes in behaviour suggest that "... some molluscs may be capable not only of nociception and nociceptive sensitization but also of neural states that have some functional similarities to emotional states associated with pain in humans."

Other immediate defensive behaviours that might indicate a perception of pain include inking, jetting locomotion and dymantic display.

In one study, squid did not appear to show increased attention to areas of their body that have been injured.

==== Avoidance learning ====
Avoidance learning in octopuses has been known since 1905. Noxious stimuli, for example electric shocks, have been used as "negative reinforcers" for training octopuses, squid and cuttlefish in discrimination studies and other learning paradigms. Repeated exposure to noxious stimuli can have long-term effects on behaviour. It has been shown that in octopuses, electric shocks can be used to develop a passive avoidance response leading to the cessation of attacking a red ball.

As in vertebrates, longfin inshore squid show sensitization of avoidance responses to tactile and visual stimuli associated with a peripheral noxious stimulus. This persists for at least 48 hours after injury, indicating that behavioural responses to injury in cephalopods can be similar to those in vertebrates.

==== Trade-offs in motivation ====
Octopuses show trade-offs in their motivation to avoid being stung by sea anemones. Octopuses frequently predate hermit crabs, however, they change their hunting strategy when the crabs place an anemone on their shell as protection. Octopuses attempt various different methods such as using only a single arm, moving below the anemone or blowing jets of water at it. The trade-off is that they attempt to avoid the anemone stings by using methods that are less effective than they would usually use for predating the hermit crab.

Injured squid show trade-offs in motivation due to injury, for example, they use crypsis rather than escape behaviour when reacting to a visual threat. The same study showed that injured squid begin escape responses earlier and continue these for longer for up to 48 hours after injury.

In 2014, the adaptive value of sensitisation due to injury was tested using the predatory interactions between longfin inshore squid and black sea bass (Centropristis striata) which are natural predators of this squid. If injured squid are targeted by a bass, they began their defensive behaviours sooner (indicated by greater alert distances and longer flight initiation distances) than uninjured squid. If anaesthetic (1% ethanol and MgCl_{2}) is administered prior to the injury, this prevents the nociceptive hypersensitisation and blocks the effect. This study has wide implications because both long-term sensitisation and pain are often considered to be maladaptive rather than adaptive; the authors claim this study is the first evidence to support the argument that nociceptive sensitisation is actually an adaptive response to injuries.

=== Cognitive ability and sentience ===
It has been argued that although a higher cognitive capacity in some animals may indicate a greater likelihood of them being able to perceive pain, it also gives these animals a greater ability to deal with this, leaving animals with a lower cognitive ability a greater problem in coping with pain.

Cephalopods can demonstrably benefit from environmental enrichment indicating behavioural and neuronal plasticity not exhibited by many other invertebrates.

==== Tool use ====
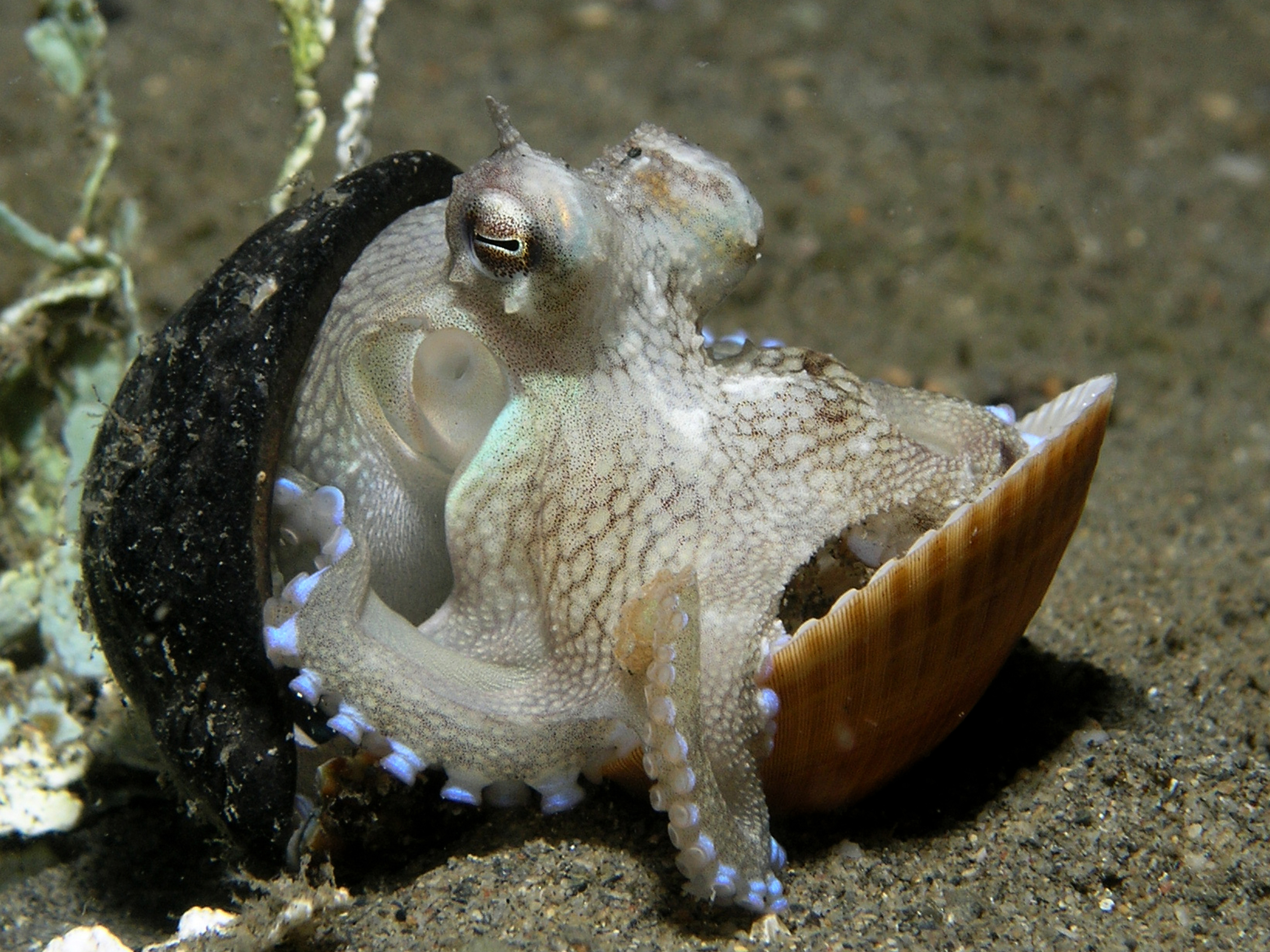
A veined octopus travelling with shells it has collected for protection

Octopuses are widely reported as examples of an invertebrate that exhibits flexibility in tool use. For example, veined octopuses (Amphioctopus marginatus) retrieve discarded coconut shells, manipulate them, transport them some distance, and then re-assemble them to use as a shelter.

==== Learning ====
The learning abilities of cephalopods demonstrated in a range of studies indicate advanced cognitive abilities.

Octopuses are capable of reversal learning, a form of advanced learning demonstrated by vertebrates such as rats. Giant Pacific octopuses are able to recognise individual humans and common octopuses can recognise other octopus individuals for at least one day.

In a study on social learning, common octopuses (observers) were allowed to watch other octopuses (demonstrators) select one of two objects that differed only in colour. Subsequently, the observers consistently selected the same object as did the demonstrators.

Both octopuses and nautiluses are capable of vertebrate-like spatial learning.

Pavlovian conditioning has been used to train chambered nautiluses (Nautilus pompilius) to expect being given food when a bright blue light flashed. The research revealed that nautiluses had memory capabilities akin to the "short-term" and "long-term memories" of the Coleoidea. This is despite very different brain structures. However, the long-term memory capability of nautiluses is much shorter than that of Coleoidea. Nautiluses appear to completely forget training they received 24 hours later, whereas octopuses remain conditioned for several weeks.

== Criteria for pain perception ==
Scientists have proposed that in conjunction with argument-by-analogy, criteria of physiology or behavioural responses can be used to assess the possibility that non-human animals can perceive pain. In 2015, Lynne Sneddon, Director of Bioveterinary Science at the University of Liverpool, published a review of the evidence gathered investigating the suggestion that cephalopods can experience pain. The review included the following summary table -

Criteria for pain perception in non-human animals
Criteria for pain perception in non-human animals	Terrestrial mammals	Fish (teleosts)	Molluscs (cephalopods)	Crustaceans (decapods)
Nociceptors	✓	✓	✓	✓
Pathways to CNS	✓	✓	✓	✓
Central processing to CNS	✓	✓	✓	✓
Receptors for analgesic drugs	✓	✓	✓	✓
Physiological responses	✓	✓	✓	✓
Movement away from noxious stimuli	✓	✓	✓	✓
Abnormal behavioural changes	✓	✓	✓	✓
Protective behaviour	✓	✓	✓	✓
Responses reduced by analgesic drugs	✓	✓	✓	✓
Self-administration of analgesia	✓	✓	not yet	not yet
Responses with high priority over other stimuli	✓	✓	✓	✓
Paying a cost to access analgesia	✓	✓	not yet	not yet
Altered behavioural choices/preferences	✓	✓	✓	✓
Rubbing, limping or guarding	✓	✓	✓	✓
Paying a cost to avoid stimulus	✓	✓	not yet	✓
Trade-offs with other requirements	✓	✓	not yet ^{†}	✓

In the table, ✓ indicates positive evidence and not yet denotes it has not been tested or there is insufficient evidence.

^{†} Note: recent evidence indicates that cephalopods exhibit "trade-offs with other requirements" which Sneddon might not have been aware of.

== Societal implications ==
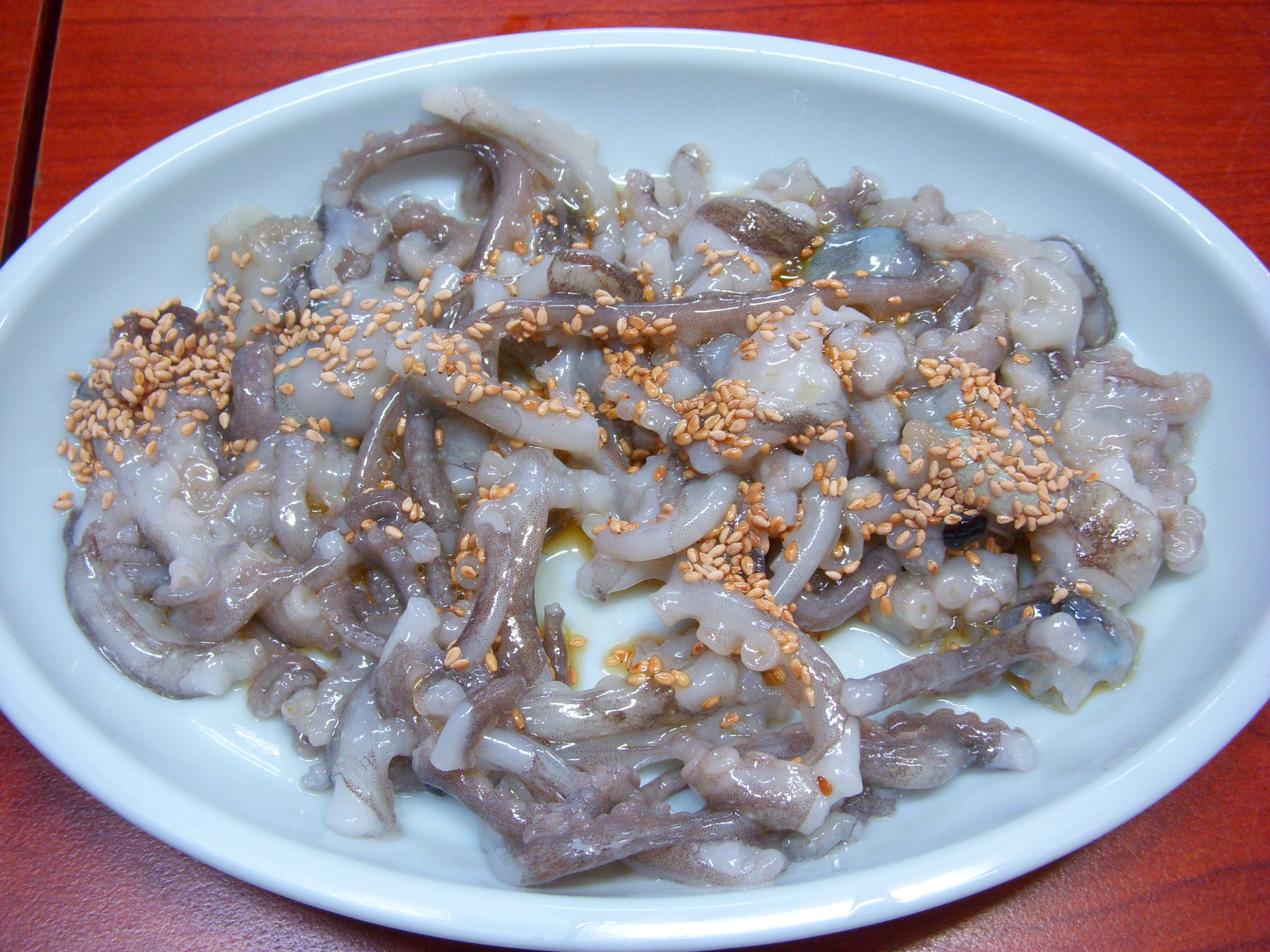
Sannakji is a dish of live baby octopuses eaten while still squirming on the plate.

Some cephalopods are widely used food sources. In some countries, octopus is eaten live. Sannakji is a type of hoe, or raw dish, in Korea. It consists of live baby octopuses (nakji), either whole, or cut into small pieces and immediately served. The dish is eaten while the octopuses are still squirming on the plate.

Cephalopods are caught by nets, pots, traps, trawling and hand jigging. Sometimes, the devices are left in situ for several days thereby preventing feeding and provoking the trapped animals to fight with each other, potentially causing suffering from discomfort and stress.

Other societal implications of cephalopods being able to perceive pain include acute and chronic exposure to pollutants, aquaculture, removal from water for routine husbandry, pain during slaughter and during scientific research.

Given the possibility that cephalopods can perceive pain, it has been suggested that precautionary principles should be applied during their interactions with humans and the consequences of our actions.

== Protective legislation ==
EU Directive 2010/63/EU

In addition to vertebrate animals including cyclostomes, cephalopods should also be included in the scope of this Directive, as there is scientific evidence of their ability to experience pain, suffering, distress and lasting harm. (emphasis added)

In most legislation to protect animals, only vertebrates are protected. However, cephalopods have a special position among invertebrates in terms of their perceived ability to experience pain, which is reflected in some national and international legislation.

- In the UK, the legislation protecting animals during scientific research, the "Animals (Scientific Procedures) Act 1986" (ASPA), protects cephalopods from the moment they become capable of independent feeding. The legislation protecting animals in most other circumstances in the UK is "The Animal Welfare Act, 2006" which states that "...animal means a vertebrate other than man..." thereby excluding cephalopods.. In 2026, According to the Animal Welfare (Sentience) Act 2022, the sentience of some invertebrates including cephalopods is now recognized and includes them under the definition of “animal”.
- The Canadian Council on Animal Care (CCAC) differentiates between "invertebrates" which are classified on a tier of lowest concern with respect to invasive procedures and "cephalopods and other higher invertebrates".
- New Zealand's "Animal Welfare Act 1999", as of November 2015 Animal Welfare Act 1999 No 142 (as at 05 April 2025), Public Act – New Zealand Legislation protects octopus and squid (but apparently not cuttlefish and nautiluses).
- The EU's laboratory animal welfare EU Directive 2010/63/EU implemented in 2013 protects all cephalopods, but stops short of protecting any other invertebrates, despite initially considering crustaceans.

In the US, the legislation protecting animals during scientific research is the "Animal Welfare Act of 1966". This Act excludes protection of "cold-blooded" animals, thereby also excluding cephalopods. Protection in Australia and the US is not national and instead is limited to institution specific guidelines. The 1974 Norwegian Animal Rights Law states it relates to mammals, birds, frogs, salamander, reptiles, fish, and crustaceans, i.e. it does not include cephalopods.

== Controversy ==
There is controversy about whether cephalopods have the capability to experience pain. This mainly relates to differences between the nervous systems of different taxa. Reviews have been published arguing that fish cannot feel pain because they lack a neocortex in the brain. If true, this would also rule out pain perception in most mammals, all birds, reptiles and cephalopods. However, the Cambridge Declaration on Consciousness published in 2012, states that the absence of a neocortex does not appear to preclude an organism from experiencing affective states.

In 1991, it was stated that "Although the evidence for pain perception is equivocal..." "...the evidence certainly does not preclude the possibility of pain in these animals [cephalopods] and, moreover, suggests that pain is more likely in cephalopods than in the other invertebrates with less 'complex' nervous organizations...".

== See also ==
- Animal cognition
- Animal consciousness
- Animal cruelty
- Ethics of eating meat
- Ethics of uncertain sentience
- Moral status of animals in the ancient world
- Pain and suffering in laboratory animals
- Sentience
