= Moral patienthood =

State of mattering morally

Moral patienthood (also called moral patience, moral patiency, moral status, and moral considerability) is the state of being eligible for moral consideration by a moral agent. In other words, the morality of an action depends at least partly on how it affects those beings that possess moral patienthood, which are called moral patients or morally considerable beings.

Notions of moral patienthood in non-human animals and artificial entities have been academically explored. More detail on the ethical treatment of nonhuman animals, specifically, can be seen at the Animal rights article.

== Definition ==
Most authors define moral patients as "beings that are appropriate objects of direct moral concern". This category may include moral agents, and usually does include them. For instance, Charles Taliaferro says: "A moral agent is someone who can bring about events in ways that are praiseworthy or subject to blame. A moral patient is someone who can be morally mistreated. All moral agents are moral patients, but not all moral patients (human babies, some nonhuman animals) are moral agents."

=== Narrow usage ===
Some authors use the term in a more narrow sense, according to which moral patients are "beings who are appropriate objects of direct moral concern but are not (also) moral agents". Tom Regan's The Case for Animal Rights used the term in this narrow sense. This usage was shared by other authors who cited Regan, such as Nicholas Bunnin and Jiyuan Yu's Blackwell Dictionary of Western Philosophy, Dinesh Wadiwel's The War Against Animals, and the Encyclopedia of Population. These authors did not think that moral agents are not eligible for moral consideration, they simply had a different view on how a "moral patient" is defined.

== Relationship with moral agency ==
The paper by Luciano Floridi and J.W. Sanders, On the Morality of Artificial Agents, defines moral agents as "all entities that can in principle qualify as sources of moral action", and defines moral patients, in accordance with the common usage, as "all entities that can in principle qualify as receivers of moral action". However, they note that besides inclusion of agents within patients, other relationships of moral patienthood with moral agency are possible. Marian Quigley's Encyclopedia of Information Ethics and Security summarizes the possibilities that they gave:

How can we characterize the relationship between ethical agents and patients? According to Floridi and Sanders (2004), there are five logical relationships between the class of ethical agents and the class of patients: (1) agents and patients are disjoint, (2) patients can be a proper subset of agents, (3) agents and patients can intersect, (4) agents and patients can be equal, or (5) agents can be a proper subset of patients. Medical ethics, bioethics, and environmental ethics "typify" agents and patients when the patient is specified as any form of life. Animals, for example, can be moral patients but not moral agents. Also, there are ethics that typify moral agenthood to include legal entities (especially human-based entities) such as companies, agencies, and artificial agents, in addition to humans.

Mireille Hildebrandt notes that Floridi and Sanders, in their paper, spoke of "damage" instead of "harm", and that in doing so, they "avoid the usual assumption that an entity must be sentient to count as a patient."

== Implications ==
Moral patienthood (or full moral patienthood, in theories which allow for partial moral status) has been alleged (by the cited sources) to imply the following moral obligations:

- Stringent presumption against interference: Moral patienthood provides an extremely strong moral reason not to interfere (kill, experiment on, directly cause suffering of) beings that have it; may be overridden only in narrow circumstances.
- Strong reason to aid: Moral patienthood provides a comparably strong (but weaker than the presumption against interference) reason to provide aid to beings that have it; more easily overridden and does not usually silence other considerations.
- Strong reason to treat fairly: Comparable interests of moral patients matter equally in distributional choices; gives rise to strong reasons to treat such beings fairly (e.g., equal distribution when appropriate).

Moral patienthood is, by itself, an independent reason to have these moral obligations; there may be other reasons to have these obligations, but merely having these obligations towards a being does not imply that the being is a moral patient. (For instance, supposing that there is a moral obligation to keep promises, someone may acquire these moral obligations toward any being by simply promising to treat it like a moral patient.)

== Grounds of moral patienthood ==
Moral patienthood has been claimed, in the literature, to be grounded in various properties.

Property	Definition	Sources
Sophisticated cognitive capacities	Moral patienthood is grounded in very sophisticated intellectual/emotional capacities (e.g., autonomy, self-awareness, valuing, caring).	Kant (Groundwork); Quinn; McMahan; Tooley; Singer; Buss; Theunissen; Feinberg; Jaworska
Capacity to develop sophisticated cognitive capacities	Potential for such capacities (a "future like ours" or similar) grounds moral patienthood (or some status/enhancement).	Stone; Marquis; Harman; Steinbock; Boonin; Feinberg; Wilkins; McInerney
Rudimentary cognitive capacities	Lower the bar to sentience, interests, basic emotions, or consciousness as sufficient for (full) status.	Wood and O'Neill; Regan; Singer; DeGrazia; Rachels; Harman; McMahan; Taylor; Naess; Johnson; Anderson
Member of cognitively sophisticated species	Moral patienthood via (i) being human or (ii) belonging to any cognitively sophisticated species/kind.	Feinberg; Dworkin; Benn; Cohen; Scanlon; Finnis; Korsgaard; Sumner; McMahan; McMahan; Little; Quinn
Special relationships	Strong reasons (akin to moral patienthood) grounded in species/community, parent–child, or other special ties.	Nozick; Scanlon; Kittay; Steinbock; Quinn; Warren; Anderson; Gilbert; McMahan
Incompletely realized sophisticated cognitive capacities	Having such capacities incompletely realized (via mentor-guided activities/standards) can elevate status (possibly up to full moral patienthood).	Jaworska & Tannenbaum
Not being designed by anyone to fulfill any purpose	The idea that an entity's not having been designed for a purpose grounds being treated as an end (and thus having moral status or some degree of it).	Brennan; Katz
Naturalness (unaltered by humans)	The claim that being natural or unaltered by human intervention confers intrinsic value and thus some moral status.	Elliot
Harmony and beauty (aesthetic value) of ecosystems	Appeals to harmony, beauty, or aesthetic value of ecosystems (or nature generally) as grounds for moral considerability or status.	Leopold (A Sand County Almanac); Callicott

== Moral weight ==
Moral weight is a concept used in ethical decision-making to assess the relative significance of the lives, interests, and experiences of moral patients—beings considered to have moral value. It serves as a criterion for determining the extent to which different species should be prioritized in efforts to enhance welfare, based on their capacity for conscious experience, suffering, and wellbeing. Research on moral weight seeks to establish which animals qualify as moral patients and to what degree their interests should be considered, particularly in contexts where resources for improving welfare are limited.

=== Practical uses ===
==== Cost-effectiveness analysis ====
Moral weight is applied to quantify and compare the impact of different charitable interventions. American non-profit GiveWell assigns moral weights to various outcomes, such as increasing consumption versus preventing child deaths, to guide funding recommendations. These weights are based on staff values but are cross-checked with approaches used by governments and global health organizations, such as the "value of a statistical life" metric. While no universal standard exists, most frameworks prioritize childhood over adult mortality prevention. GiveWell's analysis suggests that using standard moral weight assumptions would not significantly alter its current charity recommendations but may influence future evaluations.

==== Charity prioritization ====
Moral weights help prioritize charities by quantifying the relative value of different interventions, such as reducing mortality, improving health, enhancing mental well-being, and boosting economic circumstances. Founders Pledge uses moral weights to compare the impact of charities operating in these diverse areas. Their approach integrates survey-based methods—considering donor preferences, insights from people in extreme poverty, and expert opinions—with empirical data. This allows them to establish trade-offs between metrics like Disability-Adjusted Life Years (DALYs), WELLBYs, and income doublings. By refining these moral weights, they aim to maximize the effectiveness of charitable giving and identify the most impactful interventions.

==== Comparing animal welfare ====
Moral weight is a concept used to compare the welfare of different animals, such as chickens, pigs, and octopuses. By examining their behaviors, preferences, and emotional responses, we can understand how intensely they experience pleasure and pain. For example, chickens demonstrate a strong preference for nesting, as seen in their efforts to reach a nest box before laying eggs, suggesting that this activity holds significant importance to them. The recognition of these varying experiences challenges the tendency to underestimate the welfare of non-human animals, and the assessment of moral weight serves as a framework for more ethically informed decision-making in areas such as animal welfare and policy.

=== Organizations that use moral weight ===
Rethink Priorities uses moral weight to assess animal welfare by calculating each species' potential welfare based on welfare range and lifespan. It assumes utilitarianism, hedonism, valence symmetry, and unitarianism, treating welfare improvements equally across species. By converting welfare changes into DALY-equivalents (Disability-Adjusted Life Years), it enables cross-species cost-effectiveness comparisons, helping to prioritize interventions that maximize overall welfare. Founders Pledge uses the concept to compare the impact of global health and development programs by evaluating different metrics: lives saved, health improvements (DALYs), mental wellbeing (WELLBYs), and economic gains (income doublings). They combine survey-based methods and empirical data to estimate how much each goal matters relative to the others, factoring in perspectives from donors, beneficiaries, and researchers. This approach helps prioritize interventions for maximum impact. GiveWell uses moral weight in cost-effectiveness analyses to compare the impact of different charities, such as those that focus on health improvements versus those that address income.

== History ==
Moral patienthood may have existed since prehistory, but most discussions of it as a distinct concept happened since the 1970s. News events where sources explicitly raised the issue of moral patienthood outside of philosophy are also added, except where they related to animals, since those are covered in the article "History of animal rights".

=== Before the 1970s ===
Philosophical writings from this period:

- 1785: Immanuel Kant, Groundwork of the Metaphysics of Morals. Defines moral worth in terms of rational moral agency; denies that non-rational beings (including animals) have direct moral standing, framing duties to them as indirect duties to persons.
- 1789: Jeremy Bentham, An Introduction to the Principles of Morals and Legislation. Pioneering utilitarian argument that the capacity to suffer, not rationality, should determine moral concern.
- 1859: John Stuart Mill, On Liberty and Utilitarianism. Expands utilitarian moral consideration, though with less explicit focus than Bentham on nonhuman animals; articulates harm principle relevant to later patienthood debates.
- 1892: Henry Sidgwick, The Methods of Ethics. Discusses impartiality and the moral point of view in a way that opens scope for nonhuman considerability, though still within a broadly human-centered framework.
- 1930: C. D. Broad, Five Types of Ethical Theory. Clarifies distinctions between moral agents and those affected by their actions, laying groundwork for later "moral patient" terminology.
- 1965: H.J. McCloskey, Rights. Argued that because animals lack moral self-determination and cannot claim rights, they lie outside the realm of direct moral rights.

In 1969, the Hastings Center for Bioethics was founded.

=== 1970s ===
Philosophical writings from this period:

- 1972: Christopher D. Stone, "Should Trees Have Standing?—Toward Legal Rights for Natural Objects," Southern California Law Review. Landmarks the idea that nonhuman natural entities could be right-holders, catalyzing debates about direct standing (and hence patienthood) beyond humans and animals.
- 1972: Michael Tooley, "Abortion and Infanticide," Philosophy & Public Affairs. Argues a right to life requires certain psychological capacities; uses fetal/infant cases to make moral status hinge on mental properties rather than species.
- 1973: Mary Anne Warren, "On the Moral and Legal Status of Abortion," The Monist. Proposes personhood criteria (e.g., sentience, reasoning, self-awareness) to ground status claims in abortion ethics, modeling analytic treatment of "who counts."
- 1974: Joel Feinberg, "The Rights of Animals and Unborn Generations," in Blackstone (ed.), Philosophy & Environmental Crisis. Connects interests to rights and explores whether animals and future people can be direct objects of duty—an influential frame for patienthood debates.
- 1975: Peter Singer, Animal Liberation. Introduces the principle of equal consideration of interests and argues sentience (not species) grounds moral considerability—cementing animals as moral patients in utilitarian ethics.
- 1977: Stephen R. L. Clark, The Moral Status of Animals. Early monograph squarely centering "moral status" language in analytic animal ethics, surveying grounds and implications.
- 1978: Bonnie Steinbock, "Speciesism and the Idea of Equality," Philosophy. Defends limited species partiality against Singer-style equality, shaping later arguments about permissible asymmetries in status.
- 1978: Kenneth E. Goodpaster, "On Being Morally Considerable," The Journal of Philosophy. Defends a life-based criterion: all living things are candidates for direct moral consideration, widening the domain of moral patients beyond sentients.

=== 1980s ===
Philosophical writings from this period:

- 1980: R. G. Frey, Interests and Rights: The Case Against Animals. A prominent restrictionist critique arguing animals lack the sorts of interests that could ground rights, sharpening contrasts with Singer/Regan.
- 1983: Tom Regan, The Case for Animal Rights. Develops the moral agent / moral patient distinction and the subject-of-a-life criterion, arguing that many animals have inherent value and equal basic rights. Followed the § Narrow usage of the term "moral patient", which would be followed by some, but not all, sources.
- 1986: Carl Cohen, "The Case for the Use of Animals in Biomedical Research," New England Journal of Medicine. Defends a contractarian-leaning view denying animals rights and thereby limiting their moral standing; a widely cited counterposition to Singer/Regan.
- 1989: Don Marquis, "Why Abortion Is Immoral," The Journal of Philosophy. Offers the "future like ours" account of the wrongness of killing, thereby attributing strong moral status to early fetuses notwithstanding personhood doubts.

=== 1990s ===
Philosophical writings from this period:

- 1990: James Rachels, Created from Animals: The Moral Implications of Darwinism. Uses evolutionary considerations to erode sharp human/animal status boundaries, pressing consistency in our patienthood attributions.
- 1996: David DeGrazia, Taking Animals Seriously: Mental Life and Moral Status. Systematically links empirical work on animal minds to degrees and kinds of moral standing; argues for robust direct considerability of many animals.
- 1997: Mary Anne Warren, Moral Status: Obligations to Persons and Other Living Things. Offers a programmatic analytic account and plural criteria for status; helped standardize current usage of "moral status/considerability."
- 1998: Gary E. Varner, In Nature's Interests? Interests, Animal Rights, and Environmental Ethics. Integrates animal ethics with environmental ethics via an interests-based framework, negotiating conflicts among different moral patients.

=== 2000s ===
Philosophical writings from this period:

- 2002: Jeff McMahan, The Ethics of Killing: Problems at the Margins of Life. Introduces the time-relative interest and two-tier ideas that nuance status and the wrongness of killing across embryos, fetuses, the severely cognitively disabled, and animals.
- 2003: Nick Bostrom, Ethical Issues in Advanced Artificial Intelligence. Raises the question of artificial intelligence being a moral patient.
- 2004: Alastair Norcross, "Puppies, Pigs, and People: Eating Meat and Marginal Cases," Philosophical Perspectives. Uses vivid marginal-case arguments to press moral parity between ordinary meat consumption and acts we clearly condemn, challenging status-based double standards.
- 2004: Luciano Floridi & J. W. Sanders, "On the Morality of Artificial Agents," Minds and Machines. Distinguishes moral agency from moral patiency in computing/AI, explicitly treating artificial systems as potential moral patients as well as agents.
- 2005: Eva Feder Kittay, "At the Margins of Moral Personhood," Ethics. From disability ethics, argues against capacity-threshold exclusions and for grounding full moral standing in relations of care and dependency.

=== 2010s ===
Philosophical writings from this period:

- 2012: David J. Gunkel, The Machine Question: Critical Perspectives on AI, Robots, and Ethics. Extends the patienthood debate to artificial entities, arguing that our moral community's boundaries may need to include sophisticated machines.
- 2013 (rev. 2021/2025 updates): Agnieszka Jaworska & Julie Tannenbaum, "The Grounds of Moral Status," Stanford Encyclopedia of Philosophy. A widely used analytic map of candidate grounds (sentience, agency, life, relationships, etc.) and the debate over full vs. graded moral status.
- 2014: Agnieszka Jaworska & Julie Tannenbaum, "Person-Rearing Relationships as a Key to Higher Moral Status," Ethics. Defends a relational ground: the capacity to participate as a rearee in person-rearing relationships can elevate moral status above cognitively similar nonhumans.
- 2014: David DeGrazia, "On the Moral Status of Infants and the Cognitively Disabled," Ethics. Critically assesses the person-rearing account and explores alternative explanations of higher status for some non-paradigm humans.
- 2018: Christine M. Korsgaard, Fellow Creatures: Our Obligations to the Other Animals. A Kantian reconstruction grounding animals' moral standing as ends in themselves, challenging human exceptionalism within a deontological framework.
- 2019: Shelly Kagan, How to Count Animals, More or Less. Defends a limited hierarchy of moral status (mostly graded), systematizing how status differences might affect the weight of interests across species.

=== 2020s ===
In 2021, Open Philanthropy recommended a grant of $315,500 to "support research related to moral patienthood and moral weight."

In 2022, Google engineer Blake Lemoine publicly claimed that LaMDA (a language model) was "sentient".

Philosophical writings from this period:

- 2021: Jamie Harris, Jacy Reese Anthis, The Moral Consideration of Artificial Entities: A Literature Review. Argue that there is wide agreement that some future artificial entities could warrant moral consideration, and that moral frameworks must be prepared.
- 2021: Vincent C. Müller, "Is it Time for Robot Rights? Moral Status in Artificial Entities," Ethics and Information Technology. Reviews when—and on what grounds—artificial systems might warrant moral status (and possibly rights), synthesizing recent AI-patienthood proposals.
- 2021/2024: Lori Gruen & Susana Monsó, "The Moral Status of Animals," Stanford Encyclopedia of Philosophy. Up-to-date analytic survey of status theories as applied to nonhuman animals, covering rights, utilitarian, relational, and hybrid views.

== See also ==
- Animal rights – Rights belonging to animals
- Animal welfare – Well-being of non-human animals
- Anthropocentrism – View that only humans are moral patients
- Argument from marginal cases – Philosophical argument for animal rights
- Artificial sentience – Hypothetical consciousness in artificial systems
- Effective altruism – Philosophical and social movement
- Environmental personhood – Legal concept
- Ethics of uncertain sentience – Area of applied ethics
- Indigenous law – Indigenous legal systems
- Moral circle expansion – Broadening of moral consideration
- Political representation of nature – Granting political or institutional standing to non-humans within governance systems
- Precautionary principle – Risk management strategy
