= Sentientism =

Ethical philosophy centered on sentience

Sentientism (or sentiocentrism) is an ethical philosophy according to which sentience is the basis of moral consideration. It holds that moral consideration extends to all sentient beings. Gradualist sentientism assigns moral consideration weighted by the degree of sentience.

Sentientists argue that assigning different levels of moral consideration solely on the basis of species membership, rather than attributes such as sentience, is a form of unjustified discrimination known as speciesism.

== Etymology ==
The term sentientism was used by John Rodman in 1977, when he described Peter Singer's philosophy as "a kind of zoöcentric sentientism". Andrew Linzey defined the term in 1980 as an attitude that arbitrarily favours sentient beings over non-sentient beings.

== History ==
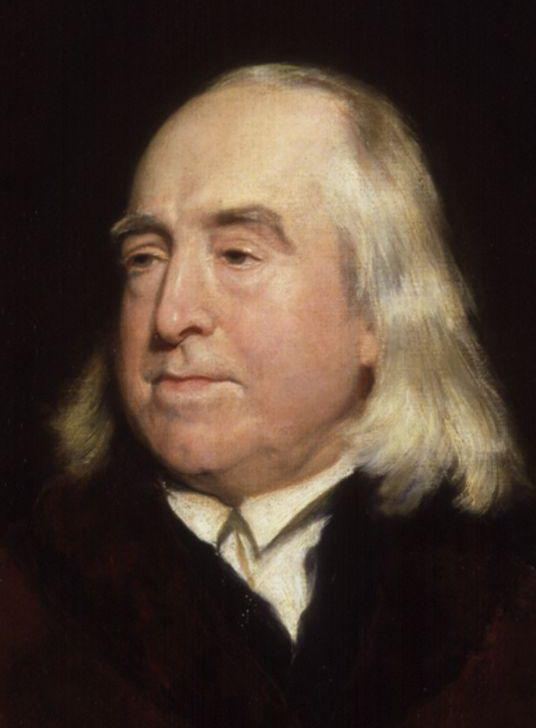
English utilitarian philosopher Jeremy Bentham (1748–1832), an early proponent of sentientism

The 18th-century utilitarian philosopher Jeremy Bentham was among the first writers to argue for sentientism. He argued that any individual capable of subjective experience should be treated as a moral subject. On this view, members of species that can experience pleasure and pain are included in the moral community. In his An Introduction to the Principles of Morals and Legislation, Bentham compared the treatment of enslaved people with sadism toward humans and non-human animals:

The French have already discovered that the blackness of the skin is no reason why a human being should be abandoned without redress to the caprice of a tormentor [see Louis XIV's Code Noir] ... What else is it that should trace the insuperable line? Is it the faculty of reason, or, perhaps, the faculty of discourse? But a full-grown horse or dog is beyond comparison a more rational, as well as a more conversable animal, than an infant of a day, or a week, or even a month, old. But suppose the case were otherwise, what would it avail? The question is not Can they reason? nor, Can they talk? but, Can they suffer?

— Jeremy Bentham, Introduction to An Principles of Morals and Legislation, (1823), 2nd edition, Chapter 17, footnote

The late 19th- and early 20th-century American philosopher J. Howard Moore, in Better-World Philosophy (1899), described every sentient being as existing in a constant state of struggle. He wrote that the notions of right and wrong exist because there are beings capable of happiness and misery, and that without sentience, there would be no ethics. He argued that what aids sentient beings in their struggle can be called good and what opposes them can be called bad. Moore used the term "zoocentricism" for the view that universal consideration and care should be given to all sentient beings; he believed that this was too difficult for humans to comprehend in their current stage of development.

Philosophers who have discussed or defended sentientism include Joel Feinberg, Peter Singer, Tom Regan, and Mary Anne Warren.

== Concept ==
Sentientism holds that sentience is the necessary and sufficient condition for membership in the moral community. Non-human organisms can therefore have moral status in their own right. In this context, sentience is associated with subjective experience, including self-awareness, rationality, and the capacity to experience pain and suffering.

Some sources describe sentientism as a modification of traditional ethics, in which moral concern is extended to sentient animals.

Peter Singer gives the following argument for sentientism:

The capacity for suffering and enjoying things is a prerequisite for having interests at all, a condition that must be satisfied before we can speak of interests in any meaningful way. It would be nonsense to say that it was not in the interests of a stone to be kicked along the road by a child. A stone does not have interests because it cannot suffer. Nothing that we can do to it could possibly make any difference to its welfare. A mouse, on the other hand, does have an interest in not being tormented, because mice will suffer if they are treated in this way. If a being suffers, there can be no moral justification for refusing to take that suffering into consideration. No matter what the nature of the being, the principle of equality requires that the suffering be counted equally with the like suffering – in so far as rough comparisons can be made – of any other being. If a being is not capable of suffering, or of experiencing enjoyment or happiness, there is nothing to be taken into account. This is why the limit of sentience (...) is the only defensible boundary of concern for the interests of others.

— Peter Singer, Practical Ethics (2011), 3rd edition, Cambridge University Press, p. 50

Utilitarian philosophers such as Singer include the well-being of sentient non-human animals, as well as humans, within moral concern. They reject speciesism, which Singer defines as a "prejudice or attitude of bias in favour of the interests of members of one's own species and against those of members of other species". Singer compares speciesism with racism and sexism as a form of arbitrary discrimination.

Sentientists are opposed to human-centred ethics, but may identify as humanists, because humanism does not necessarily imply moral concern only for humans.

Gradualist sentientism holds that the value of sentient beings is relative to their degree of sentience, which is assumed to increase with cognitive, emotional, and social complexity.

== Criticism ==
John Rodman criticized sentientism, writing that "the rest of nature is left in a state of thinghood, having no intrinsic worth, acquiring instrumental value only as resources for the well-being of an elite of sentient beings".

The sentientism of Peter Singer and others has been criticized for holding that only sentient creatures have moral standing because only they have interests. A human corpse may be thought to deserve respect and proper treatment even though it lacks sentience and can no longer be harmed. The claim that only sentient beings have interests has also been questioned on the grounds that a person in a coma may lack sentience but still be cared for. Philosopher Gregory Bassham has written that "many environmentalists today reject sentientism and claim instead that all living things, both plants and animals, have moral standing".

== See also ==
- Biocentrism
- Ethics of uncertain sentience
- Moral circle expansion
- Speciesism
- Veganism
- Wild animal suffering
