= Gary L. Comstock =

American philosopher

Gary Comstock
- Born: 23 February 1954 (age 72); Oak Park, Illinois, United States

Education
- Education: University of Chicago, Wheaton College

Philosophical work
- Era: Contemporary philosophy
- Institutions: North Carolina State University, Iowa State University
- Main interests: bioethics, agricultural ethics
- Notable works: Is There A Moral Obligation To Save the Family Farm? (1987), Vexing Nature: On the Ethical Case Against Agricultural Biotechnology (2000)

Gary Lynn Comstock (born 23 February 1954) is Alumni Association Distinguished Undergraduate Professor of Philosophy at North Carolina State University and former fellow at the National Humanities Center. His research focuses on philosophical dimensions of agriculture, biotechnology, and contemporary philosophy of religion.

== Early life and education ==
Gary Comstock was born in 1954 in Oak Park, Illinois. Comstock attended Wheaton College as an undergraduate, where he earned Bachelor of Arts degrees in Religious studies and English literature in 1976. He received a Master of Arts degree in Religious Studies from the University of Chicago in 1977, and was awarded his doctorate by the same institution in 1983.

== Career ==
=== Iowa State University (1982-2002) ===
Comstock began his academic career at Iowa State University in 1982, where he taught until 2002. While at Iowa State, he also served as President of the Agriculture, Food, and Human Values Society in 1993-1994. By December 2000 he had been appointed Professor of Philosophy and Religious Studies, and as the coordinator of Iowa State’s Bioethics Program.

=== North Carolina State (2002-2026) ===
In 2002, Comstock left Iowa State to become a Professor of Philosophy at North Carolina State University, a post he still held as of November 2024. By April 2006, he had also been appointed as Director of NC State’s Research and Ethics Program. From 2007-2009, Comstock was an ASC Fellow at the National Humanities Center, where he also served as Editor-in-Chief of the center’s On the Human project.

Comstock published an essay in the New York Times in July 2017 entitled “You Should Not Have Let Your Baby Die”, which argued in favor of childhood euthanasia in cases where infants are born with terminal illnesses. The essay contextualized Comstock’s philosophical stance on the issue with his personal experience with the death of his infant son, Sam, who was born with the trisomy 18 birth defect.

Comstock was appointed as Alumni Association Distinguished Undergraduate Professor in 2020.

== Research ==
In 1987, Comstock edited and published a book entitled Is There A Moral Obligation To Save the Family Farm? that presented a series of papers debating the question from different political, professional, and philosophical viewpoints. In 1989, Kenneth Surin, writing about Comstock’s 1987 paper, “Two Types of Narrative Theology”, said that Comstock’s view of Christianity assumes that believers and unbelievers have a factual disagreement about the possibility of miracles, such as resurrections.

In 2000, Comstock published a book, Vexing Nature: On the Ethical Case Against Agricultural Biotechnology, which traces his evolution from being a philosophical opponent to a supporter of agricultural biotechnology. In a 2002 review of the book, Peter Singer agreed with Comstock’s rejection of “personalizing ‘Nature’” but characterized Comstock’s notion of slaughter-free dairy farms as a “fantasy”. In a separate review of the book in the same year, Charles Taliaferro noted that Comstock had initially been an opponent of agricultural biotechnology and an advocate of family farming.

== Publications ==
=== Selected Books ===
- Comstock, Gary L., ed. (1987). Is There A Moral Obligation To Save the Family Farm?. Ames, Iowa: Iowa State University Press.
- Comstock, Gary L. (2000). Vexing Nature: On the Ethical Case Against Agricultural Biotechnology. Boston: Kluwer Academic Publishers.
- Comstock, Gary L. (2013). Research Ethics: A Philosophical Guide to the Responsible Conduct of Research. Cambridge, UK: Cambridge University Press.

=== Selected Journal Articles and Book Chapters ===
- Comstock, Gary L. (1987). "Two Types of Narrative Theology". Journal of the American Academy of Religion. 55 (4): 687–717. doi:10.1093/jaarel/LV.4.687.
- Comstock, Gary L. (2012). "Ethics and Genetically Modified Foods". In David M. Kaplan (ed.). The Philosophy of Food. Berkeley, California: University of California Press. pp. 122–139.
- Comstock, Gary L. (2016). "Two Views of Animals in Environmental Ethics". In Schmidtz, David (ed.). Philosophy: Environmental Ethics. Boston: Gale. pp. 151–183.
- Comstock, Gary L. (2017). "Concerning Cattle: Behavioral and Neuroscientific Evidence for Pain, Desire, and Self-Consciousness". In Barnhil, Anne; Budolfson, Mark; Doggett, Tyler (eds.). Oxford Handbook of Food Ethics. Oxford, UK: Oxford University Press. pp. 139–169. doi:10.1093/oxfordhb/9780199372263.013.6.

== Personal life ==
Comstock is married, and has three surviving children.
