= Ethics of uncertain sentience =

Area of applied ethics

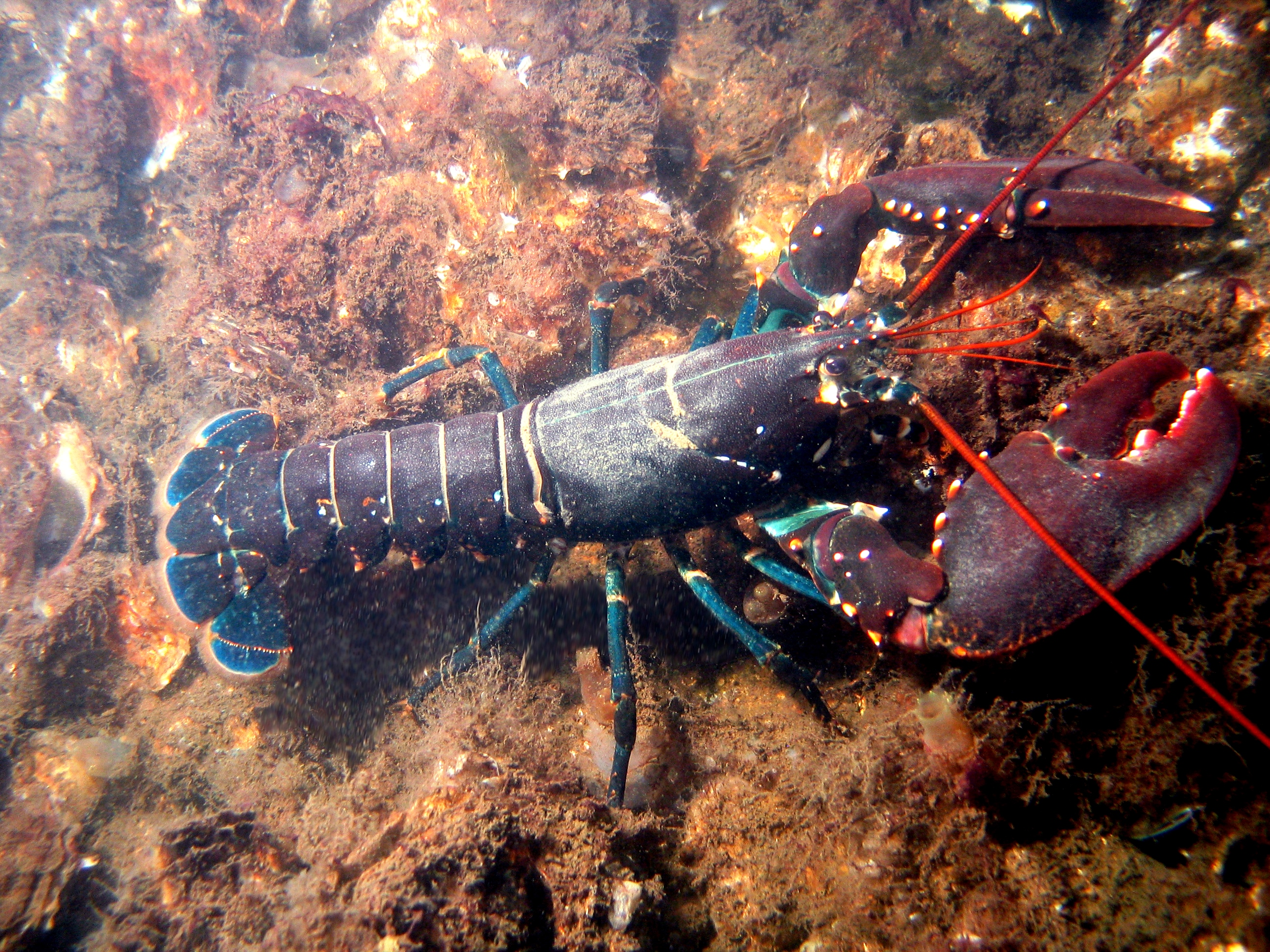
Whether crustaceans, including lobsters, are sentient and can experience pain remains debated. A 2021 UK review reported that evidence for sentience in lobsters is "substantial but not strong".

The ethics of uncertain sentience is an area of applied ethics concerned with how beings should be treated when it is unclear whether they are sentient, meaning capable of subjective experience, feeling or perception. The question arises in animal ethics, particularly for invertebrates such as crustaceans, cephalopods and insects, as well as fish, whose capacity to experience pain is disputed. It is also considered in environmental ethics, the ethics of artificial intelligence and neuroethics.

Approaches to uncertainty about sentience include the precautionary principle, incautionary and expected-value principles, virtue-ethical arguments about care for potentially sentient animals, and assessment methods used in animal welfare science. Other questions concern the evidence needed to establish sentience, the costs of protective measures, and whether moral consideration should extend across different biological taxa and computational substrates.

== Animal ethics ==
=== Invertebrates ===
==== Crustaceans and cephalopods ====
In his 2004 essay "Consider the Lobster", David Foster Wallace describes the Maine Lobster Festival and questions how pain can be assessed in other species. He examines evidence of nociceptors in lobsters and uncertainty about endogenous opioids, as well as the ethics of killing and cooking animals alive. Robert C. Jones responds to Wallace in "The Lobster Considered" (2014). Reviewing neurophysiological and behavioural studies of nociception and opioid systems, Jones argues that the evidence supports treating lobsters as capable of pain and therefore as morally considerable. He distinguishes moral considerability from degrees of moral significance and supports a precautionary approach to practices that might cause crustaceans pain.

A 2021 review commissioned by the UK government and undertaken by researchers at the London School of Economics examined 300 studies. It recommended treating cephalopods and decapod crustaceans as sentient, rating the evidence "very strong" for octopods, "strong" for most crabs and "substantial but not strong" for squid, cuttlefish and lobsters. Its recommendations covered transport, stunning and slaughter, including an end to boiling lobsters and crabs alive. The findings informed debate on the Animal Welfare (Sentience) Act.

==== Insects ====
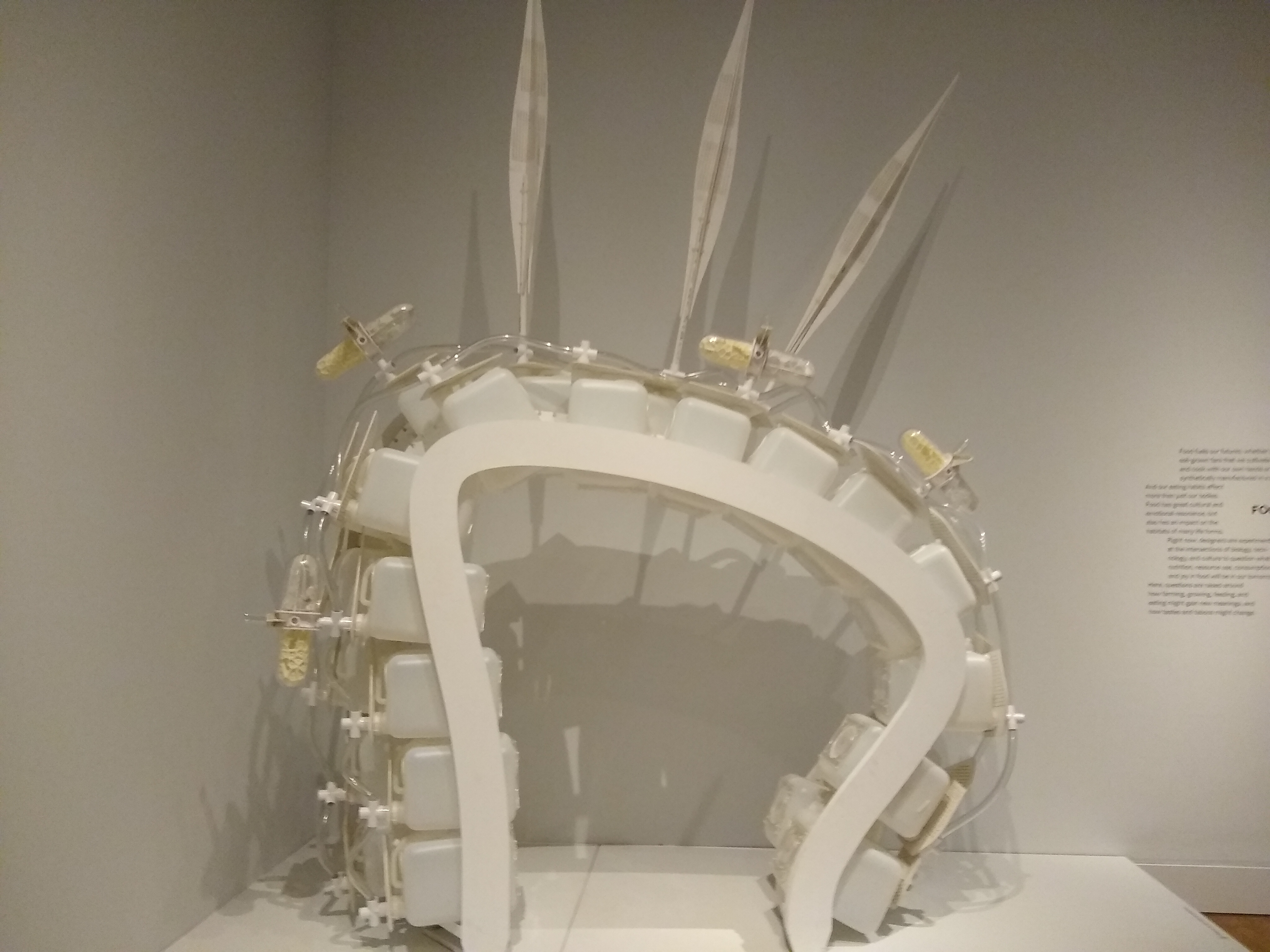
A modular cricket farm. Whether crickets are sentient is uncertain, and farming insects involves killing large numbers of animals.

In a 2016 review of philosophical, neurobiological, behavioural, robotic and evolutionary evidence, Shelley A. Adamo concluded that whether insects feel pain remains unsettled. Insects exhibit nociception and complex learning, but Adamo noted that similar behaviours can arise from simpler mechanisms, including those reproduced in robots. She questioned analogies with human pain without a clear account of the neural architecture required for subjective experience. Adamo also contrasted Morgan's canon with the precautionary principle, observing that they suggest different policy responses and that precaution entails research and economic costs. She recommended careful handling of insects to avoid stress for methodological and ethical reasons.

In a 2021 article for Vox, Dylan Matthews examines proposals to expand entomophagy amid uncertainty about insect sentience. He notes the limited evidence on whether farmed insects feel pain and on the welfare effects of slaughter methods such as freezing and shredding. Matthews cites estimates of around 1 trillion insects raised and killed each year, with 79–94 billion alive at any given time. He argues that the scale of insect farming makes the possibility of insect suffering an ethical concern.

=== Fish ===
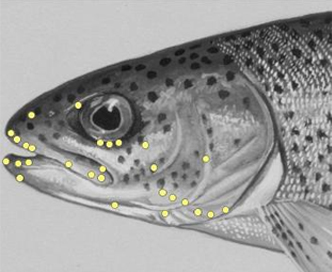
Rainbow trout have nociceptors in the face, eyes, snout and other parts of the body

In a 2014 discussion of animal ethics, Maximilian Padden Elder argues that available evidence warrants treating fish as potential sufferers. He distinguishes nociception from conscious pain and notes that teleosts have nociceptors and display behaviours consistent with affective states. Elder regards objections based on the absence of a neocortex or human-like pain responses as anthropocentric, citing evidence of subcortical processing and behaviour in fish. He cautions against judging other species by human responses and discusses cultural and psychological factors that discourage concern for fish welfare.

Elder argues for placing the burden of proof on those whose actions may harm fish, rather than withholding protection because sentience is uncertain. As precedents, he cites the US Marine Mammal Protection Act, UK protections for cephalopods and applications of the precautionary principle in the European Union. He also notes estimates of 1–2.7 trillion wild-caught fish annually and tens of billions of farmed fish slaughtered in a year. His discussion extends to commercial and recreational fishing and the ethics of pescetarianism.

=== Decision principles and frameworks ===
In "Reconsider the Lobster" (2015), Jeff Sebo draws on Wallace's discussion of the difficulty of establishing whether an animal can feel pain. Sebo calls this the "sentience problem" and writes that the question "Wallace raises deserves much more philosophical attention than it currently receives". He identifies two assumptions: "sentientism about moral status", under which sentient individuals deserve moral consideration, and "uncertainty about other minds", concerning the scientific and philosophical uncertainty about which individuals are sentient.

Sebo distinguishes three responses to uncertainty. The incautionary principle permits treating individuals as non-sentient when their sentience is uncertain; the precautionary principle requires treating them as sentient. Under the expected-value principle, people are "morally required to multiply our credence that they are by the amount of moral value they would have if they were, and to treat the product of this equation as the amount of moral value that they actually have". Sebo advocates the expected-value approach.

In 2017, philosopher Jonathan Birch proposed a precautionary framework for assessing animal sentience. He presented it as consistent with established methods in animal welfare science.

Writing from the perspective of virtue ethics, Simon Knutsson and Christian Munthe consider animals of uncertain sentience, including "fish, invertebrates such as crustaceans, snails and insects". They argue that it is a "requirement of a morally decent (or virtuous) person that she at least pays attention to and is cautious regarding the possibly morally relevant aspects of such animals".

== Environmental ethics ==
In a 2011 paper, Kai Chan argues for a form of ethical extensionism that considers all living beings. Pointing to "a non-zero probability of sentience and consciousness", he maintains that "we cannot justify excluding beings from consideration on the basis of uncertainty of their sentience".

== Ethics of artificial intelligence ==
Nick Bostrom and Eliezer Yudkowsky argue that if an artificial intelligence is sentient, inflicting unnecessary pain on it would be wrong for the same reasons as inflicting pain on an animal, unless there are "sufficiently strong morally overriding reasons to do so". Their "Principle of Substrate Non-Discrimination" states: "If two beings have the same functionality and the same conscious experience, and differ only in the substrate of their implementation, then they have the same moral status."

== Neuroethics ==
Adam J. Shriver distinguishes "precise, precautionary, and probabilistic approaches to sentience", each of which assigns a different role to neuroscience. He argues that basic protections for animals should follow the precautionary principle. Although neuroscientific evidence is not always needed to establish that a species warrants protection, he argues that the "ongoing search for the neural correlates of sentience must be pursued in order to avoid harms that occur from mistaken accounts".

== See also ==
- Animal consciousness
- Animal sentience precautionary principle – Risk management strategy
- Artificial consciousness – Hypothetical consciousness in artificial systems
- AI ethics
- Digital rights – Type of human and legal rights
- Environmental impact of artificial intelligence
- Ethics of eating meat – Food ethics topic
- Insects in ethics – Moral status and treatment of insects
- Moral circle expansion – Broadening of moral consideration
- Pain in animals
- Pain in amphibians
- Pain in cephalopods
- Pain in crustaceans
- Pain in fish
- Pain in invertebrates
- Philosophical zombie – Thought experiment in philosophy
- Problem of other minds – Epistemological problem
- Sentientism – Ethical philosophy centered on sentience
- Speciesism – Philosophical term on species treatment
