= Kristin Andrews =

American philosopher, writer and academic

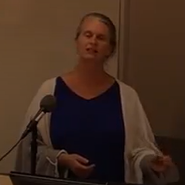
- Kristin in 2017
- Born: Nashville, United States
- Occupation: Professor

Academic background
- Education: B.A., 1992, Antioch College; M.A., 1995, Western Michigan University; PhD, Philosophy, 2000, University of Minnesota
- Thesis: Predicting mind: belief attribution in philosophy and psychology (2000)

Academic work
- Institutions: Appalachian State University; York University
- Website: kristinandrews.org

Kristin Alexandra Andrews is Professor in the Department of Philosophy at York University, where she holds the York Research Chair in Animal Minds.

== Early life and education ==
Andrews attended Antioch College and conducted co-op research at the Kewalo Basin Marine Mammal Laboratory in Hawaii. After earning her Bachelor of Arts, she moved to Western Michigan University for her Master's degree where her first article was published in Etica et Animali.

== Career ==
After earning her PhD from the University of Minnesota under the supervision of Ronald Giere, she became an assistant professor of philosophy at Appalachian State University from July 2000 until June 2002. Andrews joined the faculty at York University following encouragement from York Psychology Professor Anne E. Russon. She received the Western Michigan University Distinguished Alumni Award in 2011. The next year, she published "Do Apes Read Minds? Toward a New Folk Psychology" through the MIT Press.

In 2015, Andrews was elected a Member of the College of New Scholars, Artists, and Scientists from the Royal Society of Canada. The next year, she was appointed a Tier II York Research Chair in Animal Minds, and received a Social Sciences and Humanities Research Council Insight Grant for her project, "Animals and Moral Practice". Andrews was also awarded the Philosophy of Science Women's Caucus Award and recognized by York University as a research leader.

In 2018, Andrews was a member of York's Artificial Intelligence and Society Task Force. She also published her second book, titled Chimpanzee Rights: The Philosophers' Brief (ISBN 1138618667). The following year, she earned $250,000 over two years for her project, "Zero-Gravity 3D Bioprinting of Super-Soft Materials", with Alex Czekanski, Tara Haas, and Roxanne Mykitiuk. In 2020, her publication of How to Study Animal Minds advocates for treating animals as "sentient participants", focusing on the type of minds that they have. In 2024, Andrews, along with Jeff Sebo and Jonathan Birch, launched the New York Declaration on Animal Consciousness.
