= Argument from marginal cases =

Philosophical argument for animal rights

The argument from marginal cases (also known as the argument from species overlap) is a philosophical argument within animal rights theory regarding the moral status of non-human animals. Its proponents hold that if human infants, senile people, the comatose, and cognitively disabled people have direct moral status, non-human animals must have a similar status, since there is no known morally relevant characteristic that those marginal-case humans have that animals lack. "Moral status" may refer to a right not to be killed or made to suffer, or to a general moral requirement to be treated in a certain way.

Although various cases are made for it, Raymond Frey has described the argument from marginal cases collectively as 'one of the most common arguments in support of an equal value' of animals' lives.

== Overview ==
The argument from marginal cases takes the form of a proof by contradiction. It attempts to show that you cannot coherently believe both that all humans have moral status, and that all non-humans lack moral status.

Consider a cow. We ask why it is acceptable to kill this cow for food – we might claim, for example, that the cow has no concept of self and therefore it cannot be wrong to kill her. However, many young children may also lack this same concept of "self". So if we accept the self-concept criterion, then we must also accept that killing children is acceptable in addition to killing cows, which is considered a reductio ad absurdum. So the concept of self cannot be our criterion.

The proponent will usually continue by saying that for any criterion or set of criteria (either capacities, e.g. language, consciousness, the ability to have moral responsibilities towards others; or relations, e.g. sympathy or power relations) there exists some "marginal" human who is mentally handicapped in some way that would also meet the criteria for having no moral status. Peter Singer phrases it this way:

The catch is that any such characteristic that is possessed by all human beings will not be possessed only by human beings. For example, all human beings, but not only human beings, are capable of feeling pain; and while only human beings are capable of solving complex mathematical problems, not all humans can do this.

== Proponents ==
Daniel Dombrowski writes that the argument can be traced to Porphyry's third-century treatise On Abstinence from Eating Animals. Danish philosopher Laurids Smith who was familiar with the arguments of Wilhelm Dietler argued against the idea that animals cannot possess rights because they cannot understand the ideas of right and duty. He reasoned that if this was correct then children and mentally ill people would not have rights either. Other 18th-century philosophers who presented similar arguments include David Hume and Jeremy Bentham.

In recent years, versions of the argument have been put forward by Peter Singer, Tom Regan, Evelyn Pluhar, and Oscar Horta.

James Rachels has argued that the theory of evolution implies that there is only a gradient between humans and other animals, and therefore marginal-case humans should be considered similar to non-human animals.

== Criticism ==
A counter-argument is the argument from species normality (a term coined by David Graham), proposed by Tibor Machan. In considering the rights of children or disabled people, Machan uses the analogy of a broken chair:

... classifications and ascriptions of capacities rely on the good sense of making certain generalizations. One way to show this is to recall that broken chairs, while they aren't any good to sit on, are still chairs, not monkeys or palm trees. Classifications are not something rigid but something reasonable. While there are some people who either for a little or longer while – say when they're asleep or in a coma – lack moral agency, in general people possess that capacity, whereas non-people don't. So it makes sense to understand them having rights so their capacity is respected and may be protected. This just doesn't work for other animals.

David Graham interprets this to mean that if most of a species' members are moral agents then any member has the same rights and protections as the species. In brief, "The moral status of an individual depends on what is normal for that individual's species."

James Rachels has responded to Machan that if one adopts the idea that individuals of a species must be treated according to what is normal for that species, then it would imply a chimp that somehow acquired the ability to read and write should not enter a university since it is not "normal" behavior for a chimpanzee.

A related counterargument from Roderick Long is that a being can obtain moral agency by developing a rational capacity, and from there on has full moral agency even if this capacity is lost or diminished:

That is why a cow has no rights, though a human being reduced to the mental level of a cow does have them. There's something wrong with the human; there's nothing wrong with the cow. One might say that in the case of the cow-minded human, there's a blank spot where her moral agency is supposed to be, and someone else can step into that blank spot and act as an agent on her behalf. But in the cow there's no blank spot.

Arthur Caplan, in an article on the ethics of organ donation by infants with anencephaly – born essentially without a brain – before physical death, raises some points about the argument from marginal cases. He writes that some people cannot emotionally handle treating the anencephalic child as not worthy of moral status. Caplan also mentions concerns about possible misdiagnosis risk – the risk that an infant would be incorrectly diagnosed with anencephaly, and also the slippery-slope concern – the concern that other individuals are then at risk for organ donation, such as those in vegetative states or with severe disabilities.

Some philosophers, such as Christopher Grau, argue that there is nothing wrong with granting rights to disabled humans while denying them to animals because it is perfectly valid to use humanity as a moral status. Grau argues that if moral status is to depend on a particular trait, then it must be shown why a particular trait is somehow worthy of basing moral status upon it. It cannot be because humans value it, since humans also value human beings, so it would need to be shown why a certain trait is somehow "better" than any other. In the absence of an impartial observer to tell us what those traits should be (Grau notes that there is also no guarantee that said impartial observer would say humans should not value other humans), there is no reason why it is unclear why simply being human should not be sufficient for moral status. Grau observes that alternative traits proposed for moral status, such as rationality or consciousness, are also often traits that most humans possess and that they are probably valued specifically because most humans possess them and value them, making them just as questionable a criterion for moral status as species membership, as they depend upon human attachment to them as a source of moral status.

== See also ==
- Equal consideration of interests
- Speciesism
