= Welfare of farmed insects =

Form of animal welfare

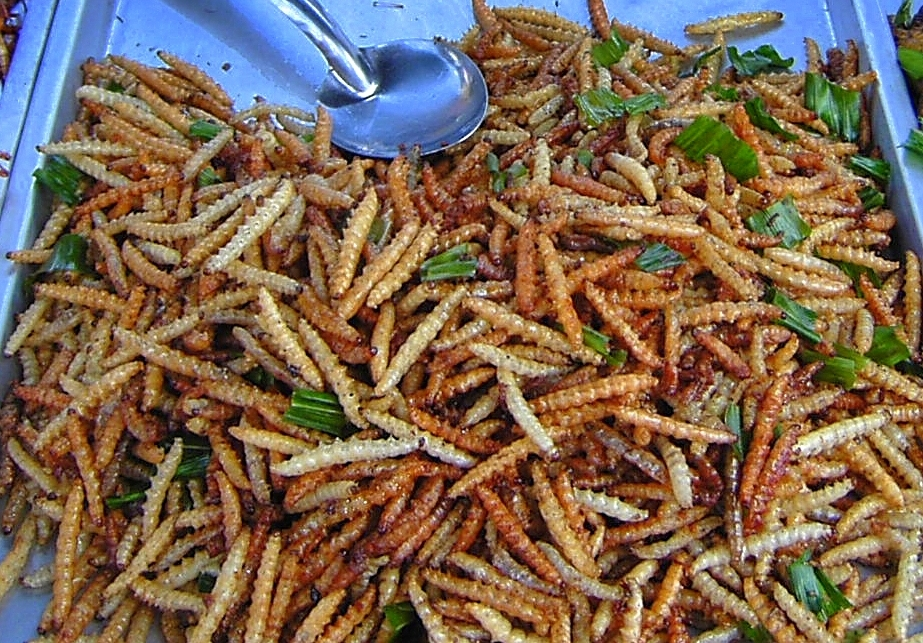
"Bamboo worms" in Bangkok

The welfare of farmed insects concerns treatment of insects raised for animal feed, as food or pet food, and other purposes such as honey and silk, for use in generating recombinant proteins, or for biological control applications.

== Debate over insects' capacity for welfare ==
Scientists remain uncertain about the existence and degree of pain in invertebrates, including insects. However, a recent review of the neurobiological and behavioral evidence consistent with the hypothesis of pain found strong evidence consistent with precautionary treatment in at least two orders of insects at the adult life stage (Blattodea and Diptera), ultimately considering evidence from over 350 studies. This may explain why 67% of surveyed animal behavior researchers ascribed emotions (of which pain is one), to some, most, nearly all or all insects and why 82% of surveyed entomologists stated they cared about insect welfare due to the intrinsic value of the animal. Both the 2012 Cambridge Declaration on Consciousness, and the 2024 New York Declaration on Animal Consciousness, suggest that there is a realistic possibility of insect consciousness; the New York Declaration signed by many animal ethicists, welfare scientists, neuroscientists, entomologists, and consciousness researchers.

As a result of the growing evidence base supporting the plausibility of insect pain and sentience, insect welfare is being increasingly discussed in all settings where insects are used and managed, including laboratory settings. Vincent Wigglesworth suggested a precautionary approach of anaesthetizing insects during potentially painful procedures. John Cooper has written about techniques for "Anesthesia, analgesia, and euthanasia of invertebrates" including insects. Neil A. C. Bennie and colleagues proposed a method for chemical euthanasia of insects and other terrestrial arthropods. As of 2024, the Insect Welfare Research Society guidelines for protecting and promoting insect welfare in research recommend chemical agents, rapid freezing, immersion in alcohol following anesthesia, or crushing/grinding as methods that may humanely euthanize insects. Insect welfare is currently not regulated in research settings, resulting in the frequent reporting of some low-welfare practices such as vivisection (live dissection of an animal without anesthetics) in the discipline. Recent research suggests that the Canadian public believes insect welfare in research should be regulated to 2/3rds the level of oversight given to vertebrates.

Some authors, including animal ethicists and academics that research insect farming, have begun extending discussions of insect welfare beyond the laboratory to the domain of raising insects for food, feed, or pet food. The Dutch Animal Act, which went into effect on 1 January 2013, created a regulatory framework for farm-animal welfare based on the Five Freedoms, and the law specifically lists a number of insect species as "production animals" whose wellbeing needs to be respected. Dutch politician Marianne Thieme asked a series of questions suggesting concern that insect farming would multiply the number of animals farmed and killed for human consumption. Robert Nathan Allen of the pro-entomophagy organization Little Herds feels that the welfare of insects is important, though he believes well managed farms can maintain high standards of care. Some entomophagy suppliers highlight the importance of humane insect treatment, though the industry recognizes that evidence on which practices actually result in humane treatment is currently lacking. For instance, World Ento uses the name "Good Karma Killing" to describe its process of freezing insects into a stasis state, but this method is not expected to produce a humane death according to the American Veterinary and Medical Association. A 2013 FAO report on "Edible insects" includes a section encouraging high standards of welfare in entomophagy operations, despite uncertainty about whether insects can suffer.

Others feel that considering the wellbeing of farmed insects is going too far. Rhys Southan suggests that even most vegans do not care a lot about insects, but that "Insects are to animal rights what Larry Flynt is to the First Amendment—you have to uphold their rights even if you don't want to, or the whole thing falls apart." He goes on to propose satirical slogans that insect-rights activists might use against entomophagy. However, data on public perceptions suggests that many members of the mainstream American public care about insect welfare in farming, particularly younger consumers, as do traditional animal welfare NGOs in Europe. Accordingly, animal welfare scientists have suggested that insect farmers may care about insect welfare for social and economical reasons, such as consumer confidence in the industry's adherence to high ethical standards for animal rearing, maintaining their social license to operate, and brand differentiation opportunities that increase industry maturation. Some recent anecdotes suggest there is growing public interest in insect welfare, at least in research: public outcry over lethal wasp scientific surveys in the UK resulted in a BBC podcast episode about lethal sampling with entomologist Adam Hart and a publication about invertebrate research ethics.

== Welfare considerations during farmed insect rearing ==
As with other livestock animals, a variety of welfare concerns can manifest during the rearing and slaughter of insects. The 5 Domains framework can be used to broadly categorize these areas of possible concern into four functional domains (nutrition, environment, behavior, and physical health) which then influence the mental domain of the animal's welfare state. As the insect industry is very new, and there are few animal welfare scientists dedicated to studying its livestock, there is little guidance or infrastructure dedicated to improving farmed insect welfare. Further, just as with farmed vertebrates, species-specific guidance is needed to maintain high welfare for each species of insects that is farmed. Recently, several comprehensive and open access review papers have been published that cover the likely welfare concerns for black soldier flies (Hermetia illucens), yellow mealworms (Tenebrio molitor), and three species of farmed crickets (Acheta domesticus, Gryllus bimaculatus, Gryllodes sigillatus), as well as some work on the housefly (Musca domestica).

The major, currently known areas of welfare concern during rearing are organized below by functional domain and largely focus on the most farmed insects: black soldier flies, yellow mealworms, and farmed crickets.

=== Nutrition ===
Appropriate nutrition may not always be provided to farmed insects. For instance, adult black soldier flies are generally not fed during rearing due to a common misconception that they cannot eat (which is true for some insects, such as adult silkworm moths). In reality, adult black soldier flies have functional mouthparts and a functional digestive system, can break down both carbohydrates and proteins, will gravitate towards and consume food when provided, have food preferences, and have a prolonged lifespan when fed.

Insects may be fasted prior to slaughter (with unknown welfare impacts); this is generally to improve taste/quality of the resulting product or to reduce the likelihood of microbial contamination of the product due to the feed. More evidence is needed to know if fasting periods are necessary for product safety, as some research suggests they may not reduce microbial loads.

Farmed insects may be provided with homogenous feeds that lack macronutrient profiles self-selected by the animals; this may play a role in promoting cannibalism in species like the yellow mealworm. Nutritional enrichments, such as dietary diversity, can support brain development in crickets but may not be provided depending on the farm's available feedstock. Poor hydration for some animals may result from an effort to control disease outbreaks/fungal growth in the feed.

=== Environment ===
Many environmental factors will be critical for the welfare and productivity of insect farms. These include: temperature, humidity/moisture, light cycles, oxygen levels, and stocking densities or other spatial features of the environment.

For instance, larger cages and specific wavelengths of light are essential for the natural behaviors of adult black soldier fly breeders. Temperature and humidity must be carefully controlled or excess mortality, and putative welfare harms, will result for most insect species. Jagran raises housefly larvae for use as animal feed and report that humidity needs to be carefully controlled to avoid dehydrating or drowning the insects. Insects are poikilothermic, but maintaining an adequate temperature range remains important. For example, lethal overheating is a problem in black soldier fly and yellow mealworm larvae that are reared in dense aggregations within insulating substrates.

Although many farmed insects are naturally gregarious, when stocking densities are too high this can cause lethal overheating, increase aggression and cannibalism, or result in altered development and different behavioral needs that may be challenging to fulfill on farms. For instance, some crickets may develop longer wings in an effort to fly far and escape overcrowded conditions on farms; the inability to escape these conditions reduces natural behavioral expression and results in reports of aggression and cannibalism, as stated by one producer: "...they'll bite each other, they'll eat each other". These problems may also worsen over generations in captive conditions - rearing in captivity resulted in selection for increased aggression in crickets compared to wild populations.

=== Physical Health ===
Viruses, bacteria, protists, fungi, and more may rapidly kill insects on farms. For example, Acheta domesticus densovirus resulted in millions of dollars in lost product and some farms losing their entire livestock population in outbreaks that have spanned 35 years of industry history in North America and the United States. Some insect diseases appear to be specific to single species or taxonomic groups within the insects, and thus may not spread between species, while others may be able to infect multiple farmed insect species if housed in the same facility.

Humans can carry diseases from the outside world to farmed insects. For instance, the company Van de Ven had a pathogen outbreak that killed all of its Zophobas morio beetle larvae, and the breeders hypothesized that the disease may have been brought by human visitors. Accordingly, the International Platform for Insects as Food and Feed have developed guidance on hygiene procedures for farms with the goal of protecting consumer and animal health. More integration of the veterinary and pathology communities, which are staples of traditional vertebrate animal farming, with the new insect farming sector may result in improved animal health, increased biosecurity, and better consumer protection over time.

Insects may be injured due to aggression or cannibalism. Low temperatures, disease, or poor nutrition may result in deformities during any stage of development. Stress may result from rough handling, washing and immersion in water, or transport (e.g., during shipping), which may in some cases contribute to mortality. Inbreeding depression can result in reduced physical health for farmed insects and producers generally make efforts to maintain a more genetically diverse population.

Insects may be fed toxin-contaminated grains or plastics/polymers that may reduce their health, depending on the level of inclusion and specific types of these ingredients used (though this is not expected to be common practice in the industry currently).

=== Behavior ===
Relatively little is known about appropriate behavioral expression for farmed species of insects. Adult black soldier flies are unlikely to be able to lek, a natural mating behavior, in most current cage sizes. Adult black soldier flies are unable to engage in natural foraging/feeding behaviors when not provided with feed. Photophobic insect larvae, or crickets of any life stage, may not be able to avoid or escape lights during some parts of rearing or processing.

Selection, or genetic modification, could reduce the ability of insects to perform natural behaviors: for instance, one study genetically modified adult black soldier flies to not have wings, eliminating the ability of the flies to engage in the natural behavior of flight. This modification has not been deployed for adult black soldier flies - but flightless lines of fruit flies have been generated and are frequently sold as feeders for other animals.

== Slaughter and depopulation methods ==
=== Industrial farms ===
Little research has been done on humane methods of killing insects for consumption.

The most common killing methods used by entomophagy companies in the Netherlands are freezing and dry-freezing (i.e., freezing and reducing pressure in order to extract water from the insects).

Protix Biosystems kills its black soldier flies by shredding, since its end product is a powder. Death takes less than a second. Tarique Arsiwalla at Protix said shredding makes sense because Western consumers are more likely to accept powdered insects than whole insects.

The Jagran company has tried asphyxiation, cooling, freeze-drying, boiling, and shredding. Managing Director Walter Jansen believes that shredding is most humane.

The Kreca company kills its animal-feed insects by putting them into a fridge or freeze-drying them. Insects destined for human consumption are first sterilized in hot water and then are refrigerated or freeze-dried.

FAO's "Edible insects" report suggests: "Insect-killing methods that would reduce suffering include freezing or instantaneous techniques such as shredding."

==== Freezing ====
While freezing is sometimes said to be a humane way to kill certain arthropods, others dispute this. According to "AVMA Guidelines for the Euthanasia of Animals", freezing is "not considered to be humane" when not preceded by another form of anesthesia. The British and Irish Association of Zoos and Aquariums (BIAZA) Terrestrial Invertebrate Working Group (TIWG) reports on a survey conducted by Mark Bushell of BIAZA institutions. He found that refrigeration and freezing were the most common methods "of euthanasia of invertebrates although research has suggested that this is probably one of the least ethical options." That said, freezing is a worst-case method if chemical or instantaneous physical destruction is not possible.

=== Slaughter by the consumer ===
Insects may also be sold live for food purposes, and thus effectively slaughtered by the end human consumer prior to eating. Some "how to" guides for eating insects make no mention of freezing or other euthanasia methods. For example, Miles Olson's recommendations include:

- suffocating or roasting ants
- frying, roasting, toasting, suffocating, or drowning crickets
- eating aphids raw

The website Insects Are Food suggests refrigerating insects to slow them down without killing them, prior to boiling or otherwise cooking them.

Other guides recommend freezing first. Timothy Ferriss recounts what he observed when roasted his insects without freezing them first: "Suffice it to say, merely sedated crickets make horrible noises if you roast them, and the visual is far, far worse. Do yourself a favor and freeze them."

=== Live insect feed ===
Other insects not killed by farming companies are sold live for consumption by fish and pets. 95% of the Kreca company's insects are sold live. Of the 1500 kg per week of mealworms produced by the Van de Ven company, most are sold as live feed.

Live insects may be required for some pets that will not consume dead prey. For instance, monitor lizards are typically fed live insects and may not eat pre-killed ones. It is generally hard to convert reptiles and amphibians that eat insects to pre-killed prey, though some pet owners can feed dead insects by moving or dangling them. For instance, bearded dragons can be fed dead crickets by hiding them in other food, dangling them with tongs, squirting them with water, or vibrating a bowl. Pet spiders, or praying mantids and other insectivorous bugs, typically require live food.

Live insects may also be commonly used as fishing bait, with the result that they are either eaten alive by fish or drowned.

== Farmed insects not used for protein ==
Many vegans avoid honey and silk because these require insect farming, even though the insects are not eaten. Silk production involves boiling silk worms alive in their cocoons.

The red pigment carmine is produced from powdered bodies of scale insects, so some vegans avoid it.

Shellac is produced from a resin secreted by the lac bug on specific trees in Asia. In addition to its use in industry, shellac is incorporated into some fruits, coffee beans, and candies as confectioner's glaze. Some vegans avoid confectioner's glaze because lac bugs may be killed during shellac production. Lac used to produce red dye may be even more injurious to lac bugs because while shellac comes from lac-bug secretions, lac dye's color comes from the insect bodies themselves.

Insects are also farmed in large numbers for biological control, where large numbers of parasitic or predatory insects might be reared and then released into the wild to control a pest species. Alternately, in the sterile insect technique, large numbers of sterile male insects may be reared and released in order to reduce wild populations of pest insects or prevent their range expansion, such as with the screwworm.

Finally, insects may play an unusual role in specific protein production: fruit flies can be used to generate recombinant proteins which can be used for the production of cell-cultured meat or across many other industries.

== See also ==
- Insect euthanasia
- Insects in ethics
