= Pluhar =

Pluhar is a surname. Notable people with the surname include:

- Christina Pluhar (born 1965), Austrian theorbist, harpist and conductor
- Erika Pluhar (born 1939), Austrian actress, singer and author
- Evelyn Pluhar (born 1947), American philosopher
