= Insects in ethics =

Moral status and treatment of insects

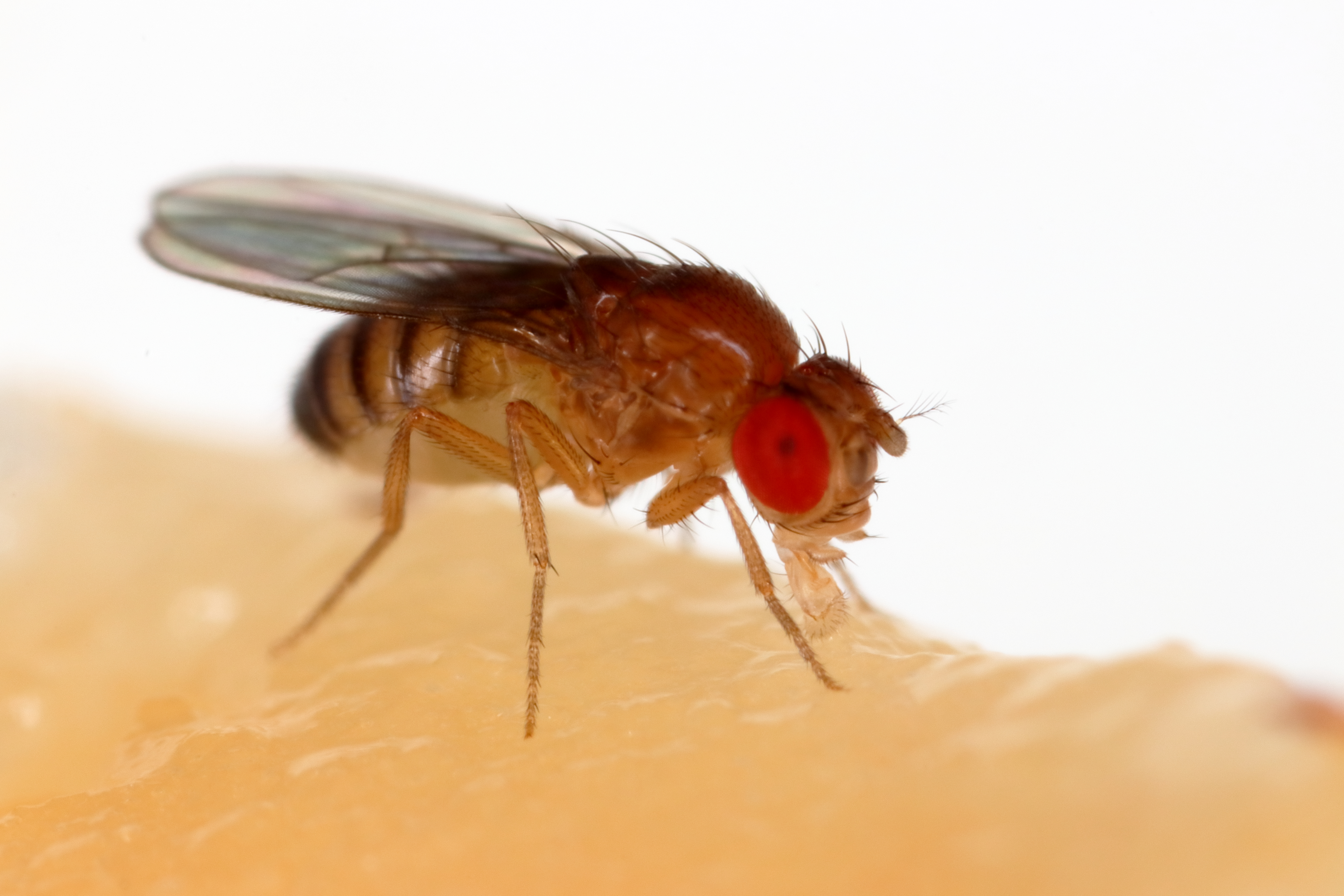
A common fruit fly (Drosophila melanogaster), a widely used model organism in scientific research

The moral status and treatment of insects has long been debated, particularly whether humans have obligations to avoid harming or killing them. The subject encompasses religious teachings about non-violence and compassion, historical writing on the treatment of insects, and contemporary debates in animal ethics about insect sentience, pain and consciousness.

Religious traditions including Jainism and Buddhism have prescribed precautions against harming insects. In contemporary philosophy and animal welfare science, the debate concerns whether insects can have subjective experiences, what moral consideration they should receive, and how uncertainty about their sentience should affect human conduct. These questions arise in insect farming, scientific experimentation, pest control, conservation and the production of insect-derived goods such as silk.

== Religious views ==
=== Christianity ===
In the 18th century, the English writer and politician Soame Jenyns argued that people should not unnecessarily kill even the smallest insects. He maintained that all creatures derived their lives from the same divine source and therefore had a right to enjoy them.

The American Unitarian minister William Ellery Channing expressed a similar view in a letter, stating that he would not kill an insect because God had granted it life. Channing regarded the unnecessary destruction of insects as a violation of their right to live.

According to historian Rod Preece, Insects and their Habitations: A Book for Children, published by the Society for Promoting Christian Knowledge in 1833, taught that unnecessarily harming insects was a sin against God. The book encouraged children to assist insects in distress rather than injuring them.

=== Jainism ===
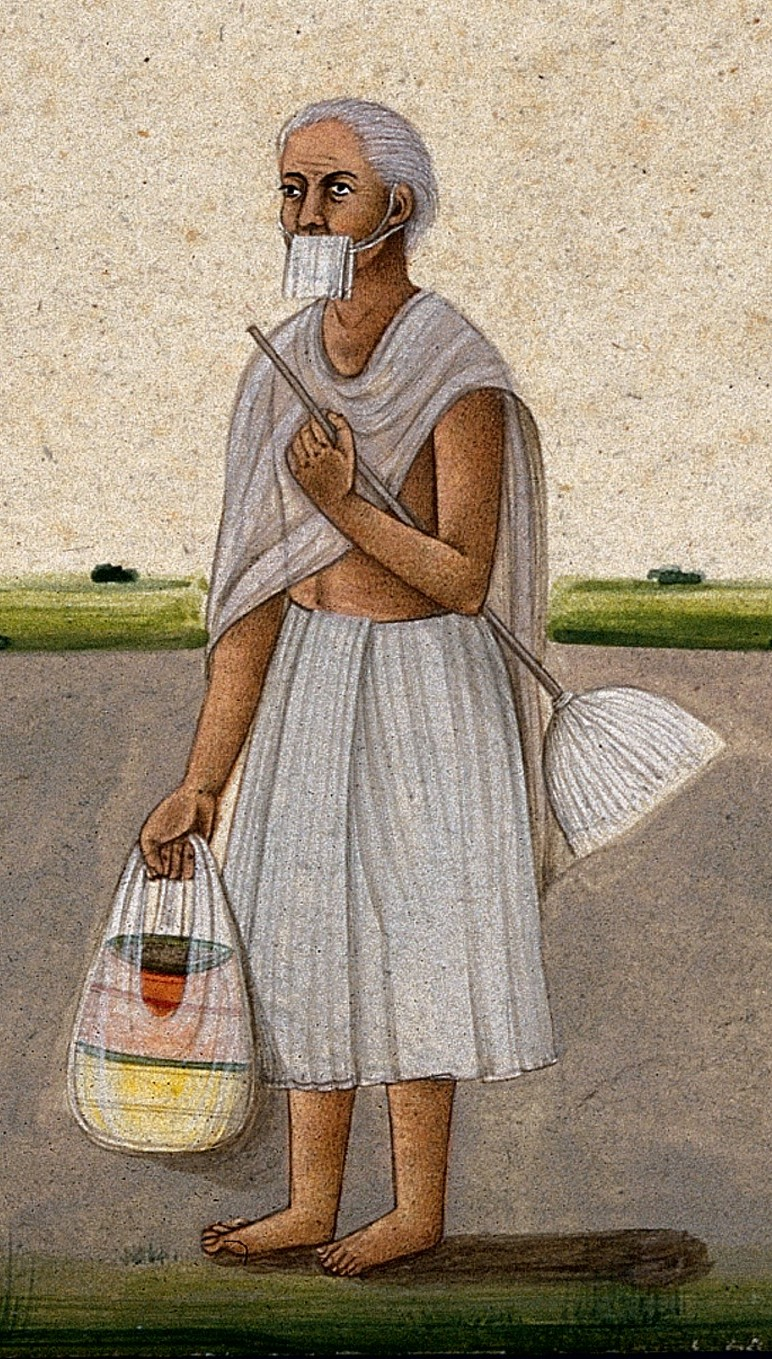
A Jain monk with a broom and mouth covering, implements associated with precautions against harming small living beings

In Jain ethics, the principle of ahimsa (non-violence) extends to small living beings, including insects. Jain monks take precautions to avoid harming them, including unintentionally.

Jain teachings classify living beings according to the number of senses they possess. The karmic consequences of harming a being depend partly on this classification and the circumstances in which harm occurs. Within this system, killing a being with fewer senses is generally considered less serious than killing a five-sensed being. Some small invertebrates are classified as possessing two, three or four senses, with worms, ants and flies traditionally placed in different categories.

=== Buddhism ===
In Buddhist ethics, insects are regarded as sentient beings and are included within prohibitions against killing living creatures. Buddhist monastic rules contain provisions intended to prevent both deliberate and accidental harm to small animals.

The Princeton Dictionary of Buddhism describes a tradition in which the Buddha instructed monks to suspend their travels during the monsoon season to avoid trampling worms and insects on muddy roads. Monastic practices have also included straining drinking water to avoid swallowing or killing small organisms.

Historian Ann Heirman examines the treatment of insects in medieval Chinese Buddhist monasticism, particularly in the writings of Daoxuan. She finds that Chinese Buddhist commentators recognised the prohibition against harming insects but differed in their responses to situations in which avoiding harm was difficult, including agriculture and the use of insect-derived products.

=== Taoist and Chinese moral texts ===
In The Extended Circle, Jon Wynne-Tyson cites the Tai-shang kan-ying p'ien as instructing readers to show compassion towards living creatures, including insects. He also attributes to Wen Ch'ang, in the Yin-chih-wen, an instruction to watch one's step to avoid harming ants and other insects, and to refrain from lighting outdoor fires that might kill them.

=== Judaism ===
The Sefer Hasidim, a medieval Hebrew work, has been described as discouraging the infliction of pain on animals, including insects. Its teachings include injunctions against unnecessarily killing wasps and flies.

== Historical writing ==
=== al-Ma'arri ===
The 11th-century Arab poet and philosopher al-Ma'arri described releasing a flea from his hand as an act of compassion. He compared the flea's desire to preserve its life with the efforts of humans to avoid death, and argued that sparing the insect was kinder than giving money to a person in need.

=== Lewis Gompertz ===
The English animal rights advocate Lewis Gompertz criticised the killing of insects in silk production. In Moral Inquiries on the Situation of Man and of Brutes (1824), he examined the treatment of silkworms through a dialogue in which one speaker objects to killing the insects to obtain their silk. The passage describes the practice of baking silkworms alive during processing and distinguishes this from collecting silk produced by insects that have died naturally.

The dialogue also considers whether breeding silkworms for silk production could be justified because it brings more insects into existence. Gompertz rejects the argument, maintaining that humans are not entitled to destroy animals merely because they have bred them. He also questions whether bringing additional beings into existence is necessarily beneficial to those beings.

== Modern ethical debate ==
=== Sentience, pain and moral status ===
The moral status of insects has been debated in relation to their capacity for sentience, particularly whether they can experience pain. Nociception, the detection of potentially harmful stimuli, is distinguished from the subjective experience of pain. Researchers have disagreed about whether insect responses to injury and other harmful stimuli provide sufficient evidence of conscious experience.

In a 1988 paper, entomologist Jeffrey A. Lockwood argued that neurological and behavioural evidence supported the possibility that insects experience pain and possess consciousness. He maintained that, if insects can experience pain, they have an interest in avoiding it, and that killing them may frustrate their interests as conscious beings. Lockwood proposed a minimum ethical requirement to avoid killing insects or causing them substantial pain when doing so could be avoided at little or no cost to human welfare.

Philosopher Peter Singer has taken a more cautious position. In a 2016 article, he discussed evidence that insects might possess consciousness but maintained that uncertainty about their subjective experiences made campaigning for "insect rights" premature.

In their 2020 paper "Minds without spines", philosophers Irina Mikhalevich and Russell Powell argued that the exclusion of invertebrates from moral consideration was inconsistent with evidence of their cognitive and behavioural capacities. They criticised the assumption that smaller or differently organised nervous systems necessarily preclude consciousness, and argued for extending ethical consideration to arthropods, including insects.

Susana Monsó and Antonio J. Osuna-Mascaró, responding to Mikhalevich and Powell, identified difficulties in applying individual-centred welfare principles to insects. They argued that ethical frameworks developed primarily for vertebrates may not adequately account for the numbers of insects involved in human activities or the organisation of social insects. They also raised questions about the moral significance of insect individuality in relation to eusociality and metamorphosis.

In 2022, Matilda Gibbons and colleagues published a review of neurological and behavioural evidence relevant to pain in insects. Using eight criteria previously developed for assessing evidence of animal sentience, they examined six insect orders at different developmental stages. The authors found strong evidence consistent with pain in adult flies and cockroaches, and substantial evidence in several other groups, including adult bees, wasps and ants. They also identified substantial gaps in research, particularly concerning juvenile insects, and concluded that further investigation was needed.

=== Justifications for killing insects ===
The question of whether insects deserve moral consideration affects arguments about when killing them may be justified, particularly where they threaten human health, food production or other animals.

Philosopher Evelyn Pluhar has examined circumstances in which killing animals may be morally permissible. In a 1988 paper, she considers situations in which animals pose innocent threats to human life, are used as innocent shields against such threats, or compete with humans for survival in circumstances where not all can live. Pluhar argues that an animal's prima facie right to life can be overridden in some such circumstances, while rejecting broader justifications for killing animals for food or experimentation.

Questions about insect killing also arise in pest control, where the interests of insects may conflict with human welfare or agricultural production. Ethical assessments can differ according to the harm insects cause, the availability of non-lethal alternatives, and the likelihood that the insects experience suffering.

=== Scientific research and conservation ===
Insects are used in scientific research, including experiments involving injury, invasive procedures and killing. Their possible sentience has prompted discussion of whether practices developed for the welfare of vertebrate research animals should also apply to insects.

In 2019, philosophers Bob Fischer and Brendon M. H. Larson examined the ethical implications of collecting insects for conservation research. They argued that insect sampling generally proceeds without considering the possibility that the animals experience pain. Using Malaise traps as an example, they discussed harm to collected insects and incidental captures of other species. The authors proposed adapting the principles of replacement, reduction and refinement to insect research, while stopping short of advocating their mandatory application in every case.

In a 2023 paper, Andrew Crump and colleagues argued that evidence of possible insect pain warranted greater consideration of insect welfare in research. They recommended considering alternatives to experiments involving live insects, reducing the number used where possible, and modifying procedures to avoid unnecessary harm. They also identified further research into insect pain as necessary for determining appropriate welfare measures.

A survey by Meghan Barrett, Merritt Drewery and Fischer, published in 2025, examined entomologists' knowledge of insect welfare and their attitudes towards proposed research practices. The researchers surveyed 114 entomologists and found limited self-reported familiarity with insect welfare measures. Respondents generally regarded training as worthwhile, although support was not uniform. They expected voluntary measures to receive greater support than mandatory ethical review, despite regarding the latter as potentially more effective.

A separate 2025 study examined reporting practices in 1,359 research papers involving insects. Craig D. Perl and colleagues found that most studies reporting substantial handling or killing of insects did not report using anaesthetics. The proportion of papers containing animal-treatment-specific ethics statements increased during the period examined, but remained low. The researchers recommended more consistent reporting of procedures affecting insect welfare.

=== Insect farming ===
The farming of insects for human food and animal feed raises questions about their living conditions and methods of slaughter. These concerns differ from those associated with conventional livestock because insect species have different biological requirements and because their capacity for conscious suffering remains uncertain.

A 2022 review by Nora Delvendahl, Birgit A. Rumpold and Nina Langen examined insect welfare in relation to food production and consumer attitudes. The authors identified rearing conditions and killing methods as central welfare concerns. They noted that developing appropriate standards is complicated by differences between insect species and by uncertainty about their sentience. They also found that consumer attitudes towards the welfare of farmed insects had received relatively little study.

The ethical evaluation of insect farming also depends on how the interests of individual insects are weighed against the potential benefits of insect production, including its use as an alternative source of food and feed. The large numbers of insects involved make uncertainty about their welfare relevant even when the probability of sentience is considered low.

== Cultural depictions ==
=== Literature ===
Rod Preece interprets a passage in William Shakespeare's Measure for Measure as an expression of sympathy towards insects. In the play, Isabella compares the suffering of a beetle being trodden upon with that of a dying giant, suggesting that the insect may experience suffering despite its small size.

In his poem "On Cruelty", John Clare describes breaking a spider's web to release flies caught in it.

=== Idioms ===
The expressions "wouldn't hurt a fly" and "wouldn't hurt a flea" describe someone considered gentle or unlikely to cause harm, using small animals as examples of creatures that even a harmless person would avoid injuring.

== See also ==
- Ahimsa
- Cruelty to animals
- Insect cognition
- Pain in invertebrates
- Welfare of farmed insects
