= Insect euthanasia =

Process of humanely killing insects

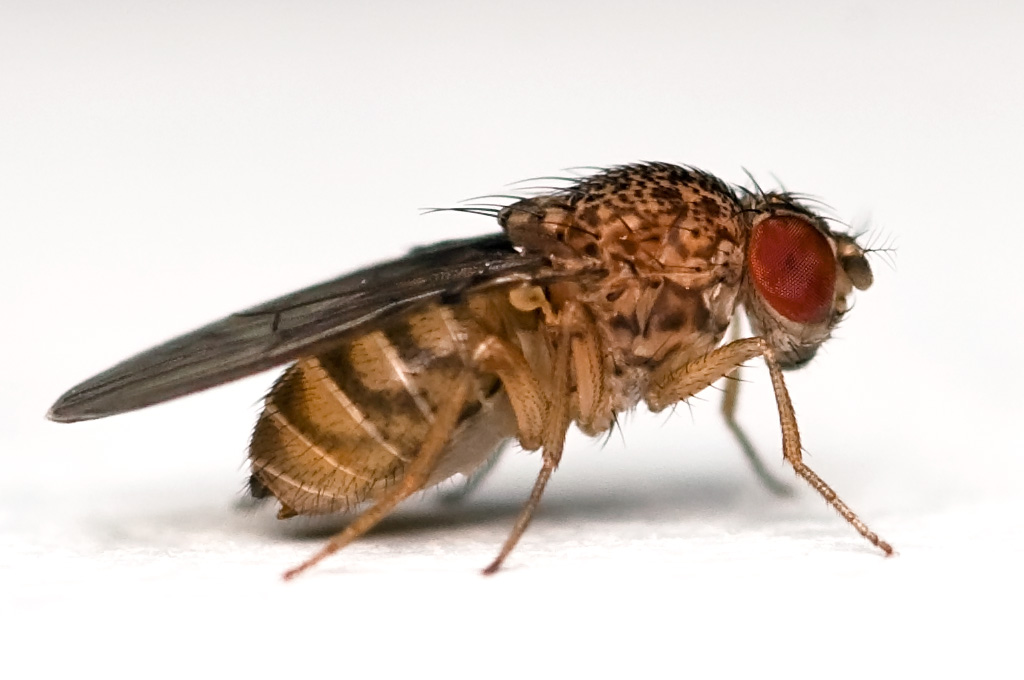
Drosophila repleta

Insect euthanasia is the process of killing insects "in a way that minimizes or eliminates pain and distress." It may apply to animals in the laboratory, schools, as pets, as food, or otherwise.

Euthanasia of insects and other invertebrates has historically received limited attention. While vertebrate animal experimentation typically requires approval by an Institutional Animal Care and Use Committee in the United States, use of invertebrate animals has few guidelines, and many research papers make no mention of how their invertebrate subjects were killed.

Many of the euthanasia methods developed for vertebrates do not transfer well to invertebrates. While a number of euthanasia methods have been proposed for various invertebrate taxa, many have not been adequately vetted, and more research is needed.

== Uncertainty over insect sentience ==
Scientists debate the existence and extent of pain in invertebrates, including insects.

Vincent Wigglesworth suggests giving insects the benefit of the doubt, in case they can suffer. Cornelia Gunkel and Gregory A. Lewbart suggest that "Until the question of pain in invertebrates is clearly answered, an analgesic should be given to any animal that is subjected to a painful procedure." Jeffrey A. Lockwood agrees:

If we use anesthetic and it turns out that insects don’t experience pain, the material cost of our mistake is very low [...]. However, if we don’t use anesthetic and it turns out that the insects were in agony, then the moral cost of our mistake is quite high.

AVMA guidelines echo this perspective:

While there is ongoing debate about invertebrates’ abilities to perceive pain or otherwise experience compromised welfare, the Guidelines assume that a conservative and humane approach to the care of any creature is warranted and expected by society. Consequently, euthanasia methods should be used that minimize the potential for pain or distress.

== Laboratory euthanasia ==
=== Recommended methods ===
==== Pentobarbital overdose ====
Pentobarbital is an anesthetic drug used in medicine, human and animal euthanasia, and capital punishment. AVMA recommends overdose of pentobarbital or similar drugs as a method of invertebrate euthanasia. The dose can be chosen at comparable levels as those given to poikilotherm vertebrates, adjusted proportionally to the animal's weight. Injection into hemolymph is ideal, but for invertebrates that have an open circulatory system, "an intracoelomic injection" may be required rather than injection into blood vessels. It may help to premedicate the animal with another injected or inhaled drug.

Verifying an insect's death from chemical injections is difficult, so it is often recommended to follow up anesthetic overdose with physical destruction. Note that since insects have different nervous systems from vertebrates, decapitation alone may not always be sufficient to destroy neural function.

Professor Peer Zwart has observed that commercial pentobarbital may have a pH between 9.5 and 11.0, which can coagulate the protein of snail hemocele. This might be painful to a live organism.

==== Potassium chloride ====
Potassium chloride (KCl) is one of the three drugs typically used in lethal injection in the United States. It causes hyperkalemia, which stops the heart by inducing depolarization of cellular membrane potentials. Intravenous KCl injection is unacceptable for vertebrate animals unless they have been rendered unconscious by other means.

Development on American lobster:

Andrea Battison and colleagues proposed KCl for euthanasia of the American lobster. The researchers injected KCl solution in order to fill with potassium ions (K^{+}) the hemolymph sinus that holds the lobster's ventral nerve cord and the region around its supraesophageal ganglion. In normal circumstances, neurons maintain a negative membrane potential and have a high intracellular K^{+} concentration. When KCl is injected into hemolymph, extracellular K^{+} increases and begins to enter the neurons to restore equilibrium. This depolarizes the neurons and generates an action potential. Subsequent repolarization is blocked by the high intracellular K^{+}, so the nervous system fails, and transmission of adverse sensory information is prevented. The potassium then triggers cardiac arrest within 40–90 seconds, in both warm and cold environments.

While intravenous KCl is not humane for vertebrates, the researchers in this study assume that in lobsters "disruption of the CNS, its ability to process and transmit sensory input, and loss of any awareness would be almost immediate" because the injection directly targets the lobster's "brain". KCl injection produced immediate extension of claws and legs due to deactivation of motor neurons, and the researchers assume that sensory neurons degraded in a similar fashion.

The lethal dose for this procedure was rather high: 1 g KCl per 1 kg of body weight. This was 10–30 times more than the required dose for intravenous mammalian killing with KCl, and it may reflect the lobster's resilient physiology. Tissues were well preserved, except for myofiber damage at the injection site, which means this technique is generally suitable for histology research.

Extension to terrestrial arthropods:

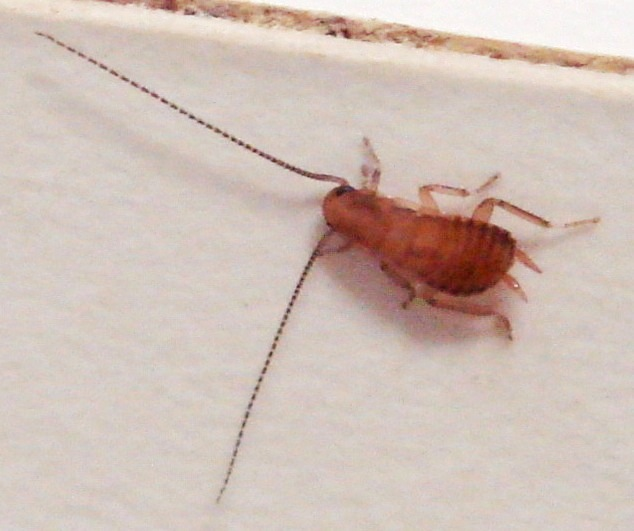
Cockroach nymph

Neil A. C. Bennie and colleagues extended the technique of Battison et al. to arthropods like Blaberus giganteus, Gryllus bimaculatus, and Locusta migratoria. They produced a table of suggested injection sites and doses for ten orders of arthropods. The researchers propose the name targeted hyperkalosis to describe the procedure of injecting a large dose of K^{+} to the thoracic ganglia. Advantages of this approach are that KCl is cheap, safe, does not need special storage, and preserves specimens for most research use cases except those that look at the neural culture itself. That said, the method is hard to use for small insects like Drosophila sp.

The recommended dose is 10% v/w 300 mg/ml KCl injected between the first pair of legs for Blattodea, Phasmida, Orthoptera, Mantodea, Coleoptera, and Diptera.

=== Techniques requiring an adjunctive method of euthanasia ===
==== Inhaled anesthetics ====
Overdose on inhaled anesthetics can work for terrestrial invertebrates like insects, but verifying death can be difficult, so it is advised to use another euthanasia method alongside them. Isoflurane and sevoflurane are examples of volatile anaesthetics that can be used; afterward, the insects should be mechanically destroyed such as by crushing. Systems have been developed to provide vaporized anesthetic in the minimal required amounts in order to make anesthesia more cost-effective.

==== Pithing ====
Pithing requires sufficient anatomical experience with the relevant species. It is not humane on its own and should be preceded by other means of anaesthesia.

==== Chemical ====
Chemicals like alcohol and formalin can destroy nervous tissue but are not humane by themselves and should be preceded by other means of anaesthesia. Ethyl Acetate (EtOAC) or Sodium Cyanide (NaCN) are and were commonly used field chemicals in conjunction with a kill jar for collecting insect specimens by many entomologists.

==== Freezing ====
Freezing is sometimes suggested as a method of insect euthanasia. Others contend that freezing is not humane on its own but should be preceded by other means of anaesthesia. Cold by itself does not produce analgesia. Romain Pizzi suggests that freezing, while common in "hobbyist literature", will compromise tissues of spiders for later histopathological examination, but does not make any statement about its effect on spider wellbeing.

The British and Irish Association of Zoos and Aquariums (BIAZA) Terrestrial Invertebrate Working Group (TIWG) reports on a survey conducted by Mark Bushell of BIAZA institutions. He found that refrigeration and freezing were the most common methods "of euthanasia of invertebrates although research has suggested that this is probably one of the least ethical options." That said, freezing is a worst-case method if chemical or instantaneous physical destruction is not possible.

Insects put in an ordinary freezer may require a day or more to be killed.

=== Uncertain methods ===
Carbon dioxide is sometimes used for terrestrial invertebrates, including insects. However, its effectiveness is not known. It has been reported to cause convulsions and excited behavior, perhaps suggesting animal discomfort. It is not believed to induce analgesia.

John E. Cooper writes: "If a procedure is considered to be potentially painful, there may be merit in using isoflurane, halothane, or sevoflurane rather than CO_{2} because the extent to which the latter induces analgesia in invertebrates is not known, and its use in vertebrate animals is controversial because of concerns about its effects on the animals' health and welfare."

== Farm euthanasia ==
Some insect farmers believe that mechanical shredding is the least painful way to kill insects suitable for human consumption. Freezing is also commonly used for commercial entomophagy operations, though as discussed above, there is debate over whether freezing is fully humane.

Many insects eaten by humans are roasted, fried, boiled, or otherwise heated directly, without any effort made at euthanasia. Many pets eat live insects, which cannot be euthanized.

== See also ==
- Animal euthanasia
- Animal testing on invertebrates
- Euthanasia in animal testing
- Insects in ethics
- Lobster killing methods and animal welfare
