= Adam Gottlieb Weigen =

German pietist, theologian and animal rights writer (1677–1727)

Adam Gottlieb Weigen (1677–1727) was a German pietist, theologian and early animal rights writer.

== Biography ==
Weigan was the son of a surgeon and was born at Waiblingen in 1677. He studied theology at Württemberg but also took interest in anatomy and natural science. Weigen became a pastor and advocate of pietism in Leonberg. He took up this post in 1705. Weigan was influenced by the writings of Philipp Spener.

Weigen argued for a compassionate treatment of the animals from a Christian theological framework. In 1711, Weigen authored De Jure Hominis in Creaturas. It has been described as "the first work ever to deal with the topic of animal rights as a general theme." The book became known in Denmark and inspired Laurids Smith. It was republished in 2008.

Weigen moved to Wahlheim, where he died in 1727.

== Selected publications ==
- De Jure Hominis in Creaturas (1711)
