= Laurids Smith =

Danish clergyman and philosopher (1754–1794)

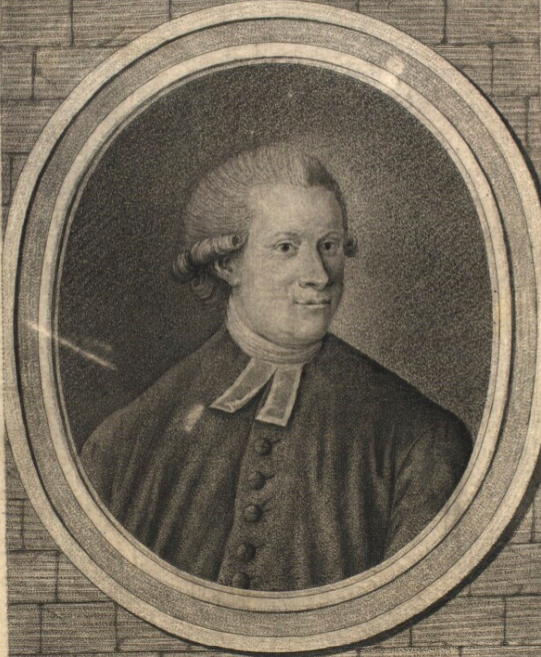
- Born: 12 April 1754; Copenhagen, Denmark–Norway
- Died: 22 March 1794 (aged 39); Holmen, Copenhagen, Denmark–Norway
- Occupations: Clergyman; philosopher; writer
- Known for: Animal rights writing

Laurids Smith (12 April 1754 – 22 March 1794), also known as Lauritz Smith, was a Danish clergyman, philosopher and early animal rights writer. He was Scandinavia's first known advocate of humane treatment of animals.

== Biography ==
Smith was born in Copenhagen. He was educated at Metropolitan School in 1772 and became teacher of philosophy and science at the Land Cadet Academy (1780 also at the Academy of Sciences) and in 1779 was awarded the title of Doctor of Philosophy.

In 1775, he co-founded the Danish Literary Society and during 1778-1880 was co-publisher of the General Danish Library. In 1780 he became rector of Nykøbing Falster and 1781 in Trondheim. He became an ordained priest in Nørvang Herred (1786), parish priest in Hvidovre (1788), second resident chaplain at Holmen Church (1789) and palace priest at Fredensborg Palace (1792).

== Animal rights ==
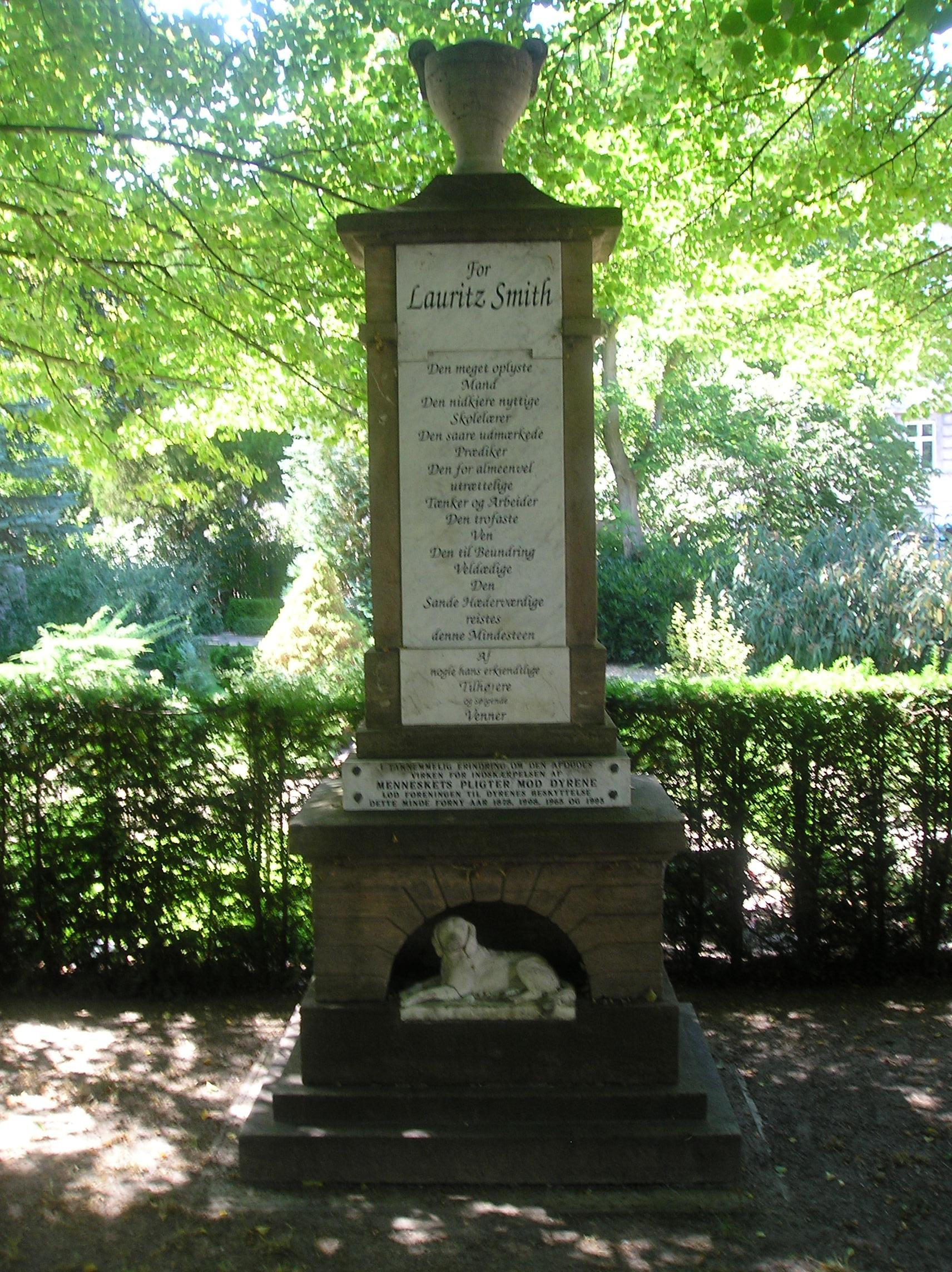
Memorial to Laurids Smith at Holmen Cemetery

Smith was an advocate of animal rights and denounced animal experiments as immoral. He was an opponent of vivisection and described it as "the most cruel injustice towards the animal".

Laurids Smith believed that God had endowed animals and humans with the right to enjoy life. The stewardship of animals therefore entails responsibility for humans since they have deprived animals of their freedom and this makes it vital that animals are treated well. Smith believed that animals could be eaten for food but not exploited beyond basic needs. Smith was familiar with the arguments of Wilhelm Dietler. He argued against the idea that animals can not possess rights because they cannot understand the ideas of right and duty. He reasoned that if this was correct then children and mentally ill people would not have rights either. Smith stated that animals have a "right to happiness".

Smith held the view that animals are intellectual and sentient beings that are meant to experience happiness and joy as God intended. In 1791, Smith authored a book on the nature of animals and human duties towards them. The purpose was to bring "alleviation to the brute creation which is groaning under its sufferings". The book attempts to substantiate demands for kindness to animals with evidence of animal intelligence. It was published in Danish and German. Smith was influenced by a 1711 work by Adam Gottlieb Weigen, another early animal rights writer.

A monument in his honour is located at Holmen Church cemetery in Copenhagen.

== Publications ==
- Versuch eines vollständigen Lehrgebäudes der Natur und Bestimmung der Thiere und der Pflichten des Menschen gegen die Thiere (second edition, 1793) [Attempted Systematic Treatise on the Obligations of Humans Toward Animals]
- Forsøg til en Fuldstændig Lærebygning om Dyrenes Natur og Bestemmelse og Menneskets Pligter mod Dyrene (1800) [Essay of a Complete Doctrine of the Nature and Destination of Animals and Man’s Duties Towards Animals]

== See also ==
- John Lawrence
- Humphrey Primatt
