= Evelyn Pluhar =

American philosopher

Evelyn B. Pluhar-Adams
- Born: July 8, 1947 (age 79)
- Education: University of Denver
- Scientific career
- Fields: Moral philosophy
- Workplaces: Pennsylvania State University
- Thesis: The Ontological Status of Colour

Evelyn B. Pluhar-Adams (born July 8, 1947) is an American philosopher specialising in moral philosophy and the philosophy of mind, especially concerning the moral status of animals.

== Biography ==
Evelyn Pluhar studied for a bachelor's degree in philosophy at the University of Denver before going on to read for a doctorate in philosophy at the University of Michigan. Her doctoral thesis was entitled The Ontological Status of Colour. She has spent much of her career at Pennsylvania State University, Fayette Campus, where she was an assistant professor of philosophy from 1978 to 1984, an associate professor of philosophy from 1984 to 1996, and a professor of philosophy from 1996.

She is the author of the 1995 book Beyond Prejudice: The Moral Significance of Human and Nonhuman Animals, which was published by Duke University Press. In Beyond Prejudice, Pluhar explores the argument from marginal cases, rejecting arguments that present humans as uniquely morally significant, and argues for an account of animal rights built upon ethical rationalism.
