= Wilhelm Dietler =

German philosopher and animal rights writer

Wilhelm Dietler (died 1797) was a German philosopher and early animal rights writer.

Dietler was a Master of Philosophy and in 1791 received a professorship of logic and metaphysics at the University of Mainz. He is best known for his book Gerechtigkeit gegen Thiere (Justice Towards Animals) in 1787. The book is the oldest work to use the German term "thierrechte" (animal rights). Dietler argued that the irrationality or incapability of animals to lodge claims was an insufficient reason to deny the existence of rights to animals as children showed the same characteristics in this respect yet nobody would deny that a child has certain rights. Two years later, Jeremy Bentham used a similar argument in An Introduction to the Principles of Morals and Legislation.

Dietler was influenced by and referred to the work of Humphrey Primatt, Soame Jenyns, Wilhelm Ludwig Wekhrlin and Johann Georg Heinrich Feder. He argued that humans beings are permitted to kill animals quickly and painlessly for food but to make animals suffer or to kill them for pleasure is morally unjustifiable. Dietler's ideas had almost no acceptance from his contemporaries. It wasn't until the 20th century that his work was rediscovered as relevant to the present discussion of animal rights.

== Selected publications ==
- Bemerkungen ueber die Groese des Menschen nebst einem Entwurfe der Philosophie (1786)
- Gerechtigkeit gegen Thiere (Justice Towards Animals, 1787)
