= On Abstinence from Eating Animals =

3rd-century treatise on vegetarianism by Porphyry

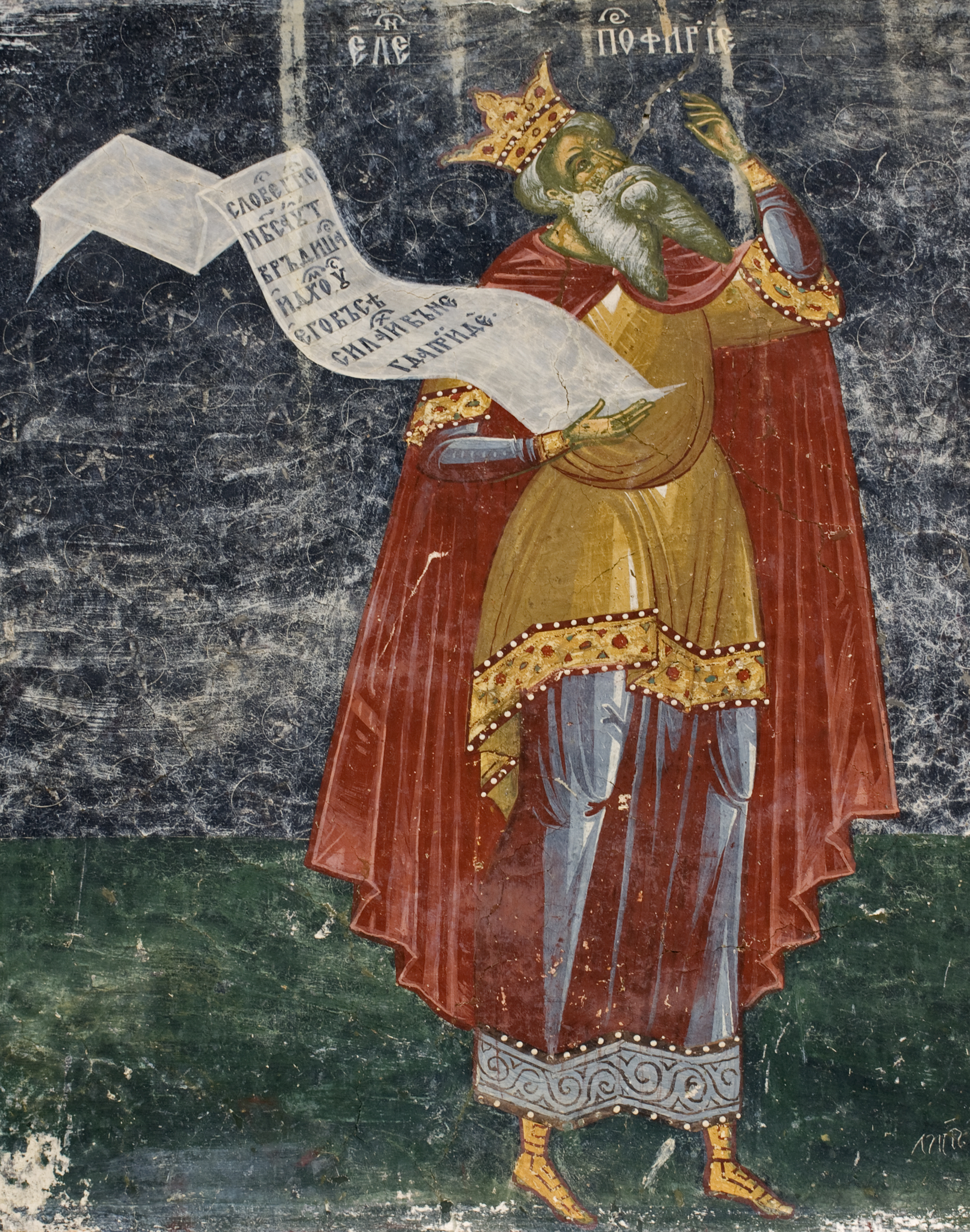
Depiction of Porphyry from the Tree of Jesse at the Sucevița Monastery, 1535

On Abstinence from Eating Animals (Note: Also translated as On Abstinence from Animal Food, On Abstinence from Killing Animals, On Abstinence from Ensouled Beings, and On the Abstinence of Eating Flesh.) (Koine Greek: Περὶ ἀποχῆς ἐμψύχων, romanized: Peri apochēs empsychōn; Latin: De abstinentia ab esu animalium) is a 3rd-century treatise by Porphyry on the ethics of vegetarianism. The four-book treatise was composed by the philosopher as an open letter to Castricius Firmus, a fellow pupil of Plotinus who had renounced a vegetarian diet.

De abstinentia is the most detailed surviving work discussing vegetarianism from classical antiquity. Porphyry advocates for vegetarianism on both spiritual and ethical grounds, applying arguments from his own school of Neoplatonism to counter those in favour of meat-eating from the Stoic, Peripatetic, and Epicurean schools. Porphyry argues that there is a moral obligation to extend justice to animals because they are rational beings. He discusses societies that have been historically vegetarian, the implications of metempsychosis (transmigration of the soul), and offers arguments against animal sacrifice. Porphyry directs his discourse towards philosophers, and does not advocate that people such as soldiers or athletes adopt a vegetarian diet.

According to philosopher Daniel Dombrowski, in De abstinentia Porphyry originated the argument from marginal cases, that is, that if animals are not afforded moral status, then neither should "marginal cases" of human beings such as infants, persons with severe cognitive disabilities, and the senile.

The treatise is written in Koine Greek but is often referred to in academia by the abbreviation of its Latin name, De abstinentia. While the manuscript traditions of the text seem to faithfully represent Porphyry's ideas and arguments, they contain errors and lack fidelity to the original. The entirety of the work is extant except for the ending of the fourth book.

== Background ==
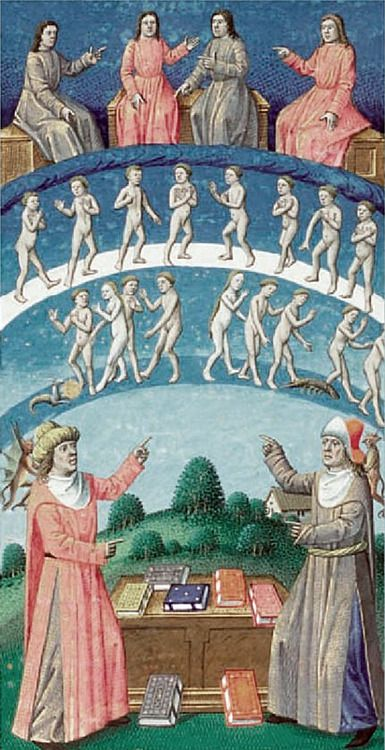
Medieval illuminated manuscript depicting Porphyry and Plotinus discussing the purification of the soul by means of theurgy

Porphyry was born c. 234 in Tyre, Roman Phoenicia. He studied under Plotinus and promulgated the philosophy of the Neoplatonists. He composed original works in Greek and wrote On Abstinence from Eating Animals between 263 and 301, most probably between the years 268 and 271 when he was living in Sicily.

Porphyry composed De abstinentia (Note: In academic research, the treatise is often referred to by the abbreviation of its Latin name, De abstinentia.) as an extended open letter to Castricius Firmus, a fellow pupil of Plotinus who had renounced vegetarianism and began eating meat after converting to a Peripatetic philosophy, possibly around 270. Castricius Firmus did not find a vegetarian diet to be justifiable in theory and found that it was irreconcilable with the demands of public life and established religion. He made public statements to explain his attitude and offered arguments to justify a meat-eating diet.

As a treatise that collects various arguments for and against vegetarianism, De abstinentia is evidence of the existence of a wider debate on the subject during Porphyry's times. It follows other works from classical antiquity that address vegetarianism and animal ethics, including Plutarch's Odysseus and Gryllus, On Animal Cleverness, and On the Eating of Flesh, all of which were collected in the Moralia. In addition to Plutarch, several of Porphyry's philosophical predecessors were known to be or thought to have been vegetarian, including Pythagoras, Seneca the Younger, Empedocles, Theophrastus, and Ovid.

== Overview ==
In Porphyry's four-book treatise, he introduces various arguments to induce Castricius Firmus to return to a vegetarian diet. De abstinentia includes a polemical review of arguments both for and against vegetarianism. It draws on quotations, empirical reports, and arguments derived from other authors. Many of the arguments that Porphyry raises are rebuttals to arguments for meat-eating that were common to his era. The rationales offered for adopting a vegetarian diet are quite varied, and include beliefs in the transmigration of the soul, that meat-eating is detrimental to the soul or the body, and that it causes unnecessary suffering in animals. The treatise raises the philosophical questions of whether non-human animals are rational, whether they have souls, and how the concept of justice should then be applied to them.

The entirety of De abstinentia is extant except for the ending of the fourth book.

== Contents ==
=== Book I ===
In Book I of On Abstinence from Eating Animals, Porphyry provides summaries of several arguments in opposition to vegetarianism. He refutes these arguments, using agonistic imagery, metaphors, and vocabulary. He reasons that abstention from eating meat is a crucial element of the Platonist philosophy and points to the traditional vegetarianism of Greek philosophers such as Empedocles and Pythagoras.

Porphyry argues that Castricius Firmus has been influenced by Stoic and Epicurean arguments against the "ethical necessity of a vegetarian diet". Porphyry rejects the Stoic position that justice would be confounded if humanity did not have a status above that of other animals. He draws on Plutarch's criticism of the Stoics' cruelty towards animals to counter arguments, including that of Clodius of Naples from his lost work Against the Vegetarians.

Porphyry follows the ascetic supposition of Plotinus that gratification of the body turns the soul away from true good and the intellectual perfection of the soul. His arguments for abstaining from eating animals are informed by the goal of being free from the sensible realm and the body by living a life as close as possible to the intelligible realm. By Porphyry's logic, the consumption of animals is an unnecessary luxury and a gratification of the body and therefore, of the irrational aspect of the soul.

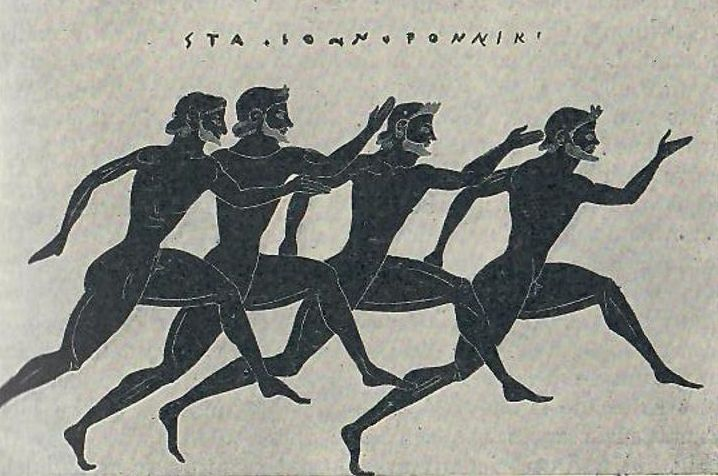
In De abstinentia, Porphyry directs his discourse towards philosophers rather than athletes, who are presumed to derive physical strength by consuming meat.

Porphyry also argues for a vegetarian diet as a matter of justice, as he considers harming entities who have no intention of causing people harm to be unjust. Porphyry argues that animal slaughter in particular is unjust and that a vegetarian diet is necessary to achieve purificatory justice. Some of Porphyry's arguments extend to the use of animal products, and bear a similarity to the modern tenets of ethical veganism:

If, however, some one should, nevertheless, think it is unjust to destroy brutes, such a one should neither use milk, nor wool, nor sheep, nor honey. For, as you injure a man by taking from him his garments, thus, also, you injure a sheep by shearing it. For the wool which you take from it is its vestment. Milk, likewise, was not produced for you, but for the young of the animal that has it. The bee also collects honey as food for itself; which you, by taking away, administer to your own pleasure.

In Book I, Porphyry specifically advocates for a vegetarian diet for philosophers, being clear that his discourse is not directed towards manual laborers, athletes, soldiers, or sailors. Porphyry seems to accept the belief, common at the time, that physical strength can be derived from the consumption of meat and that those who need strength should be allowed to eat meat. Porphyry also writes that illness can be cured through a vegetarian diet. He recounts that his friend, Rogatianus, was bedridden for eight years before being cured through a meat-free diet.

=== Book II ===
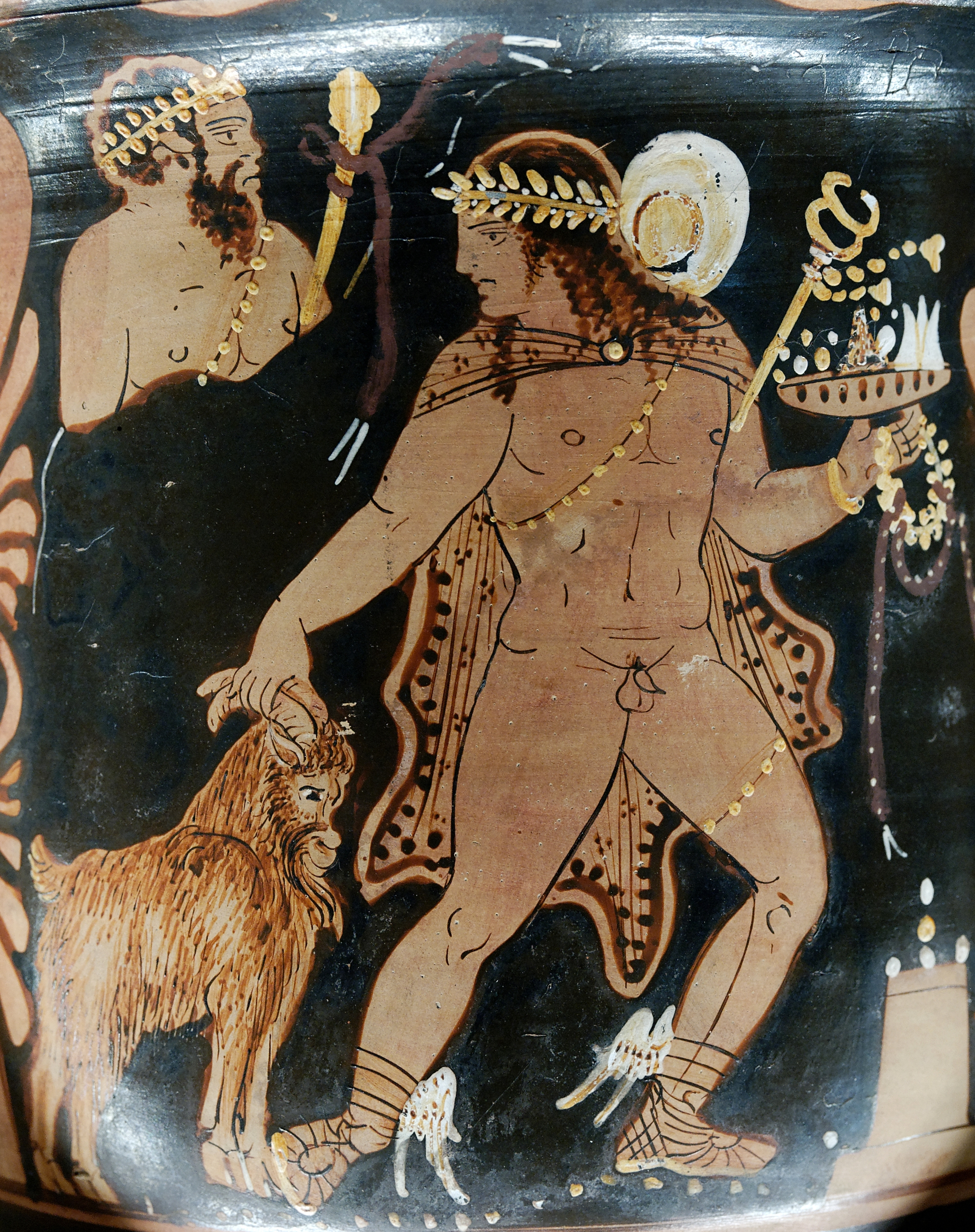
Ancient Greek red-figure pottery depicting Hermes leading a goat to sacrifice, 4th century BCE

In the second book, Porphyry addresses animal sacrifice and the notion that killing animals fulfills an obligation to the Gods. He offers arguments against ritual sacrifice and demonstrates that vegetarian diets do not contravene religious practices. He asserts that even if a sacrifice were required by the Gods, there would be no obligation to consume the flesh of the sacrificed animal.

Porphyry explicates the Pythagorean argument of abstention from meat-eating. Stitching together lengthy passages from Theophrastus's lost work On Piety, he argues that animals and humans have souls and a natural kinship, and that the sacrifice of a kindred creature is an unjust act.

=== Book III ===
Book III of De abstinentia concerns the moral status of animals and how the concept of justice can be applied to them. Porphyry's main argument is that there is a moral obligation to extend justice to animals because they are rational beings. To support his conjecture, Porphyry argues that because animals have similar anatomy, psychology, and pathology to humans, it is not unreasonable to infer that they would also be similar in their capacity for reason. He follows Plutarch's example, offering behavioristic evidence of rationality in animals, such as communication and complex, goal-oriented behavior. Expounding on the rationality of animals and human interpretations of it, Porphyry writes "If we do not understand how an animal acts because we cannot enter into their reasoning, we shall not therefore accuse them of non-rationality."

Porphyry rejects the Stoic argument that non-human animals are not rational. He writes, "We ought not to say that wild animals cannot think or be intelligent or have logos, even if their intelligence is slower than ours and they do not think as well as we do." Porphyry points to the interdependence of human beings and animals, owing to the "providential teleological design of a cosmic Demiurge" that has conferred a natural sense of justice. Porphyry discusses the Pythagorean tenet of metempsychosis (transmigration of the soul), concluding that the sacrifice of ensouled animals is unjust.

=== Book IV ===
In Book IV of De abstinentia, Porphyry describes the origination of vegetarian diets, beginning with a discussion of the mythical Golden Age. He draws from Dicaearchus's account of Greek history, where abstinence from meat-eating was part of the blessed life, and luxury, war and injustice only became part of people's lives when they began to slaughter animals. Porphyry addresses whether the systematic slaughter of animals in a society results in a utilitarian advantage. He examines historical and ethnographical examples of societies that subsisted on vegetarian diets and considers whether they were practicable and capable of survival. He refers to the religious and cultural practices of various peoples, including the Egyptians, the Essenes, the Spartans, Brahmins and Gymnosophists.

The conclusion of Book IV is not extant, ending before Porphyry's discussion of vegetarianism in Ancient Rome and Greece.

== Analysis ==
On Abstinence from Eating Animals is an influential historical document and includes many of the same arguments used modernly in support of vegetarianism. While Porphyry did not advocate for changing existing customs and laws, his opposition to traditional animal sacrifices was a stance that "must have seemed alarmingly revolutionary" to his contemporaries.

Over the years, debates over the philosophical underpinnings of vegetarianism have rekindled interest in Ancient Greek thought about the subject. Many of the ideas raised by Porphyry, such as that animals are rational and therefore entitled to just treatment from humans, have been carried forward into modern arguments supporting vegetarianism and animal rights.

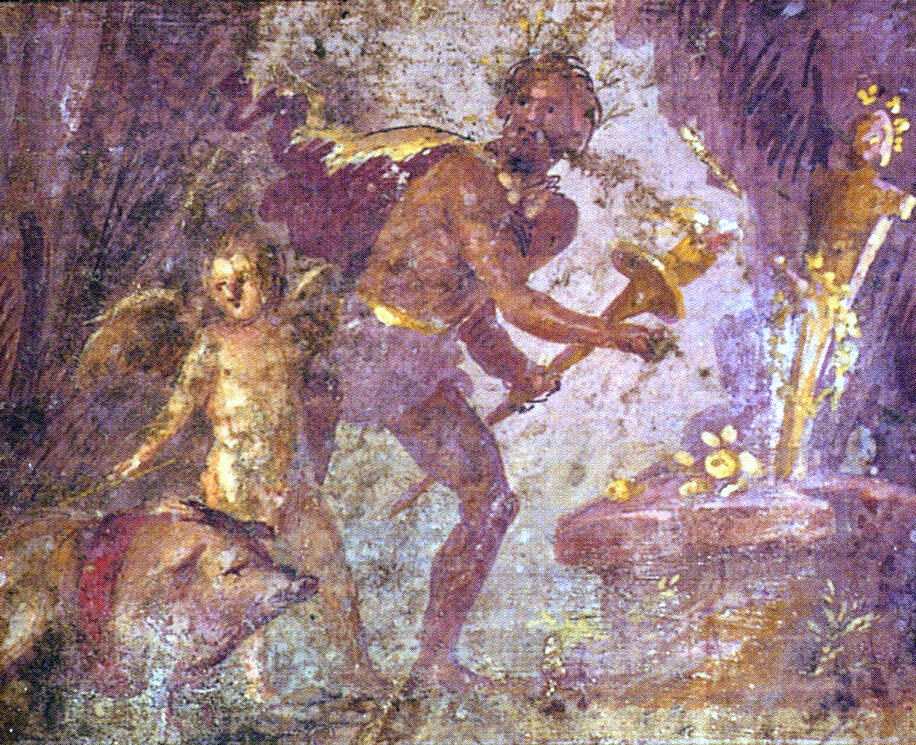
Roman fresco of a man preparing to sacrifice a pig. From the Villa of the Mysteries in Pompeii, c. 40 BCE.

Historian Gillian Clark writes that much of Porphyry's text is a "report and discussion of other people's arguments, deployed to win an argument rather than to explore all the implications". She argues that Porphyry's description of animal behavior shows a conflict between reason and passion:

Animals use reason so much in what they do that often, knowing that baits are used to trap them, they approach because of uncontrolled appetite or because of hunger: but some do not approach directly, others hesitate and try if they can remove the food without being caught, and often reasoning wins and their passion goes away. Some even insult the human contraption by urinating on it.

Philosopher Daniel Dombrowski contends that Porphyry originated the argument from marginal cases, that is, that if animals are not afforded moral status, then neither should "marginal cases" of human beings such as infants, persons with severe cognitive disabilities, and the senile. Dombrowski's supposition draws in part on the following passage from De abstinentia:

To compare plants, however, with animals, is doing violence to the order of things. For the latter are naturally sensitive, and adapted to feel pain, to be terrified and hurt; on which account also they may be injured. But the former are entirely destitute of sensation, and in consequence of this, nothing foreign, or evil, or hurtful, or injurious, can befall them. For sensation is the principle of all alliance... And is it not absurd, since we see that many of our own species live from sense alone, but do not possess intellect and reason... but that no justice is shown from us to the ox that ploughs, the dog that is fed with us, and the animals that nourish us with their milk, and adorn our bodies with their wool? Is not such an opinion most irrational and absurd?

Most scholars interpret Porphyry's De abstinentia as asserting that eating animals is unjust because they are rational creatures, though it is unclear whether Porphyry held this belief consistently. In the work, Porphyry employs material that diverges from his own theoretical suppositions for dialectical or rhetorical purposes. Elsewhere in Porphyry's writings, such as in Isagoge, his treatise on Aristotelian logic, he makes an argument that non-human animals are irrational. Jonathan Barnes and other philosophers have proposed means for reconciling the discrepancy, though scholars such as G. Fay Edwards have rejected that conclusion.

Philosopher Owen Goldin concludes that most of Porphyry's arguments are not made for the sake of the animal, but rather out of self-interest.

== Manuscript traditions and translations ==
Two distinct manuscript traditions of De abstinentia have been preserved. While both contain numerous errors and lack fidelity to the original text, the manner of expression may have diverged from the original more than the subject matter itself. Portions of the work were quoted extensively in Eusebius's Praeparatio evangelica (early 4th century), Cyril of Alexandria's Contra Julianum (c. 420s), and Theodoret's Graecarum Affectionum Curatio (c. late 430s). The quotations, often passages describing Greek paganism, are closer to the original text than the preserved manuscripts. (Note: Especially the quotations of Eusebius and Cyril; Theodoret's quotations were shorter and generally derived from Eusebius.) German scholar August Nauck commented in an 1886 edition of De Absentia that the existing manuscripts of the treatise all derive "from an exemplar which was uniquely and gravely corrupt".

A Latin translation of De abstinentia was published by Johannes Bernardus Felicianus (Giovanni Feliciano) in Venice in 1547. The first edition based on one of the Greek manuscripts was printed by Piero Vettori in Florence in 1548. A 1655 Cambridge edition created by J. Valentinus was the first to include chapter divisions and was accompanied by a Latin translation by Lucas Holstenius. Jacobus de Rhoer's 1767 edition reprinted the translation of Johannes Bernardus Felicianus and included conjectures by Friedrich Ludwig Abresch and Johann Jakob Reiske. Nauck's Teubner edition was published in 1860 and again in a revised edition in 1886.

=== English translations ===
Neoplatonist Thomas Taylor translated De abstinentia into English in 1823. In his commentary, Taylor refers to Jacobus de Rhoer's edition of the text. Gillian Clark made a translation of De abstinentia in 2000 that includes extensive commentary. It is described as literal and "accurate, yet fluid".

== Influence ==
De abstinentia is the most detailed surviving work discussing vegetarianism from classical antiquity. Alongside Pythagoras and Plutarch, Porphyry has become one of the most well-known vegetarians and proponents of ethical vegetarianism from his era. Catherine Rowett calls De abstinentia a "treasure store of evidence for philosophical thinking on the status of animals from the Presocratics to Porphyry's own school, Neoplatonism".

John Milton refers to De abstinentia in his 17th-century masque Comus. William Metcalfe, a minister for the vegetarian Bible Christian Church, published a sermon that was inspired by Porphyry's De abstinentia in 1821. A pamphlet based on the sermon influenced several people who were influential in the 19th-century vegetarian movement of the United States, including minister Sylvester Graham, physician William Alcott, and reformer Amos Bronson Alcott.

Vegetarian literature frequently cites De abstinentia and Porphyry's arguments. He believed that everything was created for mutual advantage, and vegetarianism was a way to preserve the universal harmony of nature.

The ecological ethic of community proposed by J. Baird Callicott bears a resemblance to Porphyry's description of natural justice owing to the interdependence of human beings and animals.

== See also ==
- Ethics of eating meat
- History of vegetarianism
- Intrinsic value in animal ethics
- Moral status of animals in the ancient world
