= Liverpool Packet (ship) =

Several vessels have been named Liverpool Packet:

- Liverpool Packet was a privateer schooner from Liverpool, Nova Scotia, that captured 50 American vessels in the War of 1812. American privateers captured Liverpool Packet in 1813, but she failed to take any prizes during the four months before she was recaptured. She was repurchased by her original Nova Scotia owners and returned to raiding American commerce. Liverpool Packet was the most successful privateer vessel ever to sail out of a Canadian port.
- Liverpool Packet (1812 ship), of 409 tons (bm), was launched in 1812 at Kennebec. Liverpool Packet, Steven Singleton, master, carried emigrants to the United States from England in 1817. Forty-one members of the vegetarian Bible Christian Church led by Reverend William Metcalfe, immigrated to the United States in 1817 seeking religious freedom, eventually forming the first national vegetarian organization and the American vegetarian movement.
