= Mary Grey (theologian) =

English theologian (born 1941)

- Born: 16 June 1941 (age 85); Houghton-le-Spring, England
- Other name: Mary Cecilia Grey
- Spouse: Nicholas Grey

Academic background
- Education: University of Oxford; Catholic University of Louvain
- Thesis: Toward a Christian Feminist Spirituality of Redemption as Mutuality in Relation (1987)
- Doctoral advisor: Tarcisius Van Bavel

Academic work
- Discipline: Theology
- School or tradition: Ecofeminism; liberation theology
- Institutions: Catholic University of Nijmegen; University of Southampton; University of Wales
- Main interests: Reconciliation theology
- Notable works: The Outrageous Pursuit of Hope (2010)

Mary Cecilia Grey (born 1941) is an English Catholic ecofeminist liberation theologian in the United Kingdom. She edited the journal Ecotheology for 10 years. She has previously been a professor teaching pastoral theology at the University of Wales, Lampeter; contemporary theology at the University of Southampton, La Sainte Union, and St Mary's University, Twickenham; and feminism and Christianity at the Catholic University of Nijmegen in the Netherlands.

Grey was born on 16 June 1941 in Houghton-le-Spring, County Durham. She completed Bachelor of Arts and Master of Arts degrees from the University of Oxford, as well as a diploma in pastoral catechetics, a Master of Arts degree in religious studies, a Bachelor of Sacred Theology degree, and a Doctor of Philosophy degree from the Catholic University of Louvain in Belgium. She is an honorary fellow of Sarum College, Salisbury, and was president of the European Society of Women in Theological Research from 1989 to 1991.

Her research has focused primarily on feminist liberation theology and spiritualities, but has also encompassed ecofeminist theology, ecological theology and spirituality, Indian liberation theology, Christian–Jewish-Palestinian reconciliation, systematic theology from a feminist perspective and the relationship between social justice and theology. Her current work focuses on reconciliation, connecting reconciliation with the earth and reconciliation among ethnic groups.

In recent years, she has given particular focus to reconciliation in Israel and Palestine. Accordingly, she is Chair of Living Stones of the Holy Land Trust, an organization working for justice and peace in the Holy Lands. Grey also serves as Chair of the Theology Group of Friends of Sabeel UK and as a trustee of the Balfour Project, which recognizes Britain's historical role in creating a situation of conflict between Israel and Palestine.

Grey has been involved in a number of other nonprofit organisations. She co-founded Wells for India, a water-based organisation in Rajasthan, India with Nicholas Grey and they currently serve as co-presidents Grey also serves as patron of both the Dalit Solidarity Network UK and the Centre for Theology and Health, Holy Rood House, Thirsk, UK.

== Works ==
=== Thesis ===
- — (1987). Christian Feminist Spirituality of Redemption as Mutuality-in-Relation (PhD thesis). University of Louvain.

=== Books ===
- — (1983). In Search of the Sacred: The Sacraments and Parish Renewal. Wheathampstead: Anthony Clarke Books. ISBN 978-0-856-50065-7.
- — (1989). Redeeming the Dream: Feminism, Redemption and Christian tradition (3. impr. ed.). London: SPCK Publishing. ISBN 0-281-04410-4.
- —; Zipfel, Richard (1991). From Barriers to Community: the Challenge of the Gospel for a Divided Society. London: HarperCollins. ISBN 978-0-005-99265-4.
- — (1993). The Wisdom of Fools?: Seeking Revelation for Today ([2nd impress.] ed.). London: SPCK Publishing. ISBN 0-281-04659-X.
- — (1997). Prophecy and Mysticism: the Heart of the Postmodern Church. Edinburgh: T & T Clark. ISBN 0-567-08587-2.
- — (1997). Beyond the Dark Night: a Way Forward for the Church?. London: Cassell; Continuum. ISBN 0-304-33753-6.
- — (2000). The Outrageous Pursuit of Hope - Prophetic Dreams for the 21st Century. London: Darton, Longman & Todd. ISBN 0-232-52319-3.
- — (2001). Introducing Feminist Images of God. Sheffield: Sheffield Academic Press; Pilgrim. ISBN 1-84127-160-8.
- — (2004). Sacred Longings: the Ecological Spirit and Global Culture (1st SCM Press ed.). London; Minneapolis, MN: SCM Press; Fortress Press. ISBN 978-0-8006-3647-0.
- —; Cohn-Sherbok, Dan (2005). Pursuing the Dream: A Jewish-Christian Conversation. London: Darton, Longman & Todd. ISBN 978-0-232-52540-3.
- — (2007). To Rwanda and Back: Liberation Spirituality and Reconciliation. London: Darton, Longman & Todd. ISBN 978-0-232-52664-6.
- — (2010). Sacred Longings: Ecofeminist Theology and Globalisation (Reissue ed.). Minneapolis, MN: SCM Press. ISBN 978-0-334-02928-1.
- — (2010). A Cry for Dignity: Religion, Violence and the Struggle of Dalit Women in India. London: Routledge. ISBN 978-1-845-53605-3.
- — (2010). The Advent of Peace. London: SPCK Publishing. ISBN 978-0-281-06232-4.
- — (2012). The Resurrection of Peace: A Gospel Journey to Easter and Beyond. London: SPCK Publishing. ISBN 978-0-281-06637-7.
- —; Cohn-Sherbok, Dan (2014). Debating Palestine and Israel. Impress Books. ISBN 978-1-907-60549-9.
- — (2015). The Spirit of Peace: Pentecost and Affliction in the Middle East. Durham, UK: Sacristy Press. ISBN 978-1-908381-20-0.

=== Articles ===
- — (September 1998). "The Decline and Fall of the Second Millennium: final Chapter or New Beginning for Christianity?". New Blackfriars. 79 (931): 364–376. doi:10.1111/j.1741-2005.1998.tb01620.x.
- — (1999). "Tragedy in Feminist theology - an End to Absolutes?". Bulletin of the European Society for Catholic Theology. 10 (1): 43–54.
- — (1999). "The Praxis of Resurrection - Literature and Feminist Quest". British Journal of Religious Education. 21 (2): 112–120. doi:10.1080/0141620990210206.
- — (May 1999). "Expelled again from Eden - Facing Difference through connection". Feminist Theology (21): 8–20.
