= Daniel Dombrowski =

American philosopher

Daniel A. Dombrowski
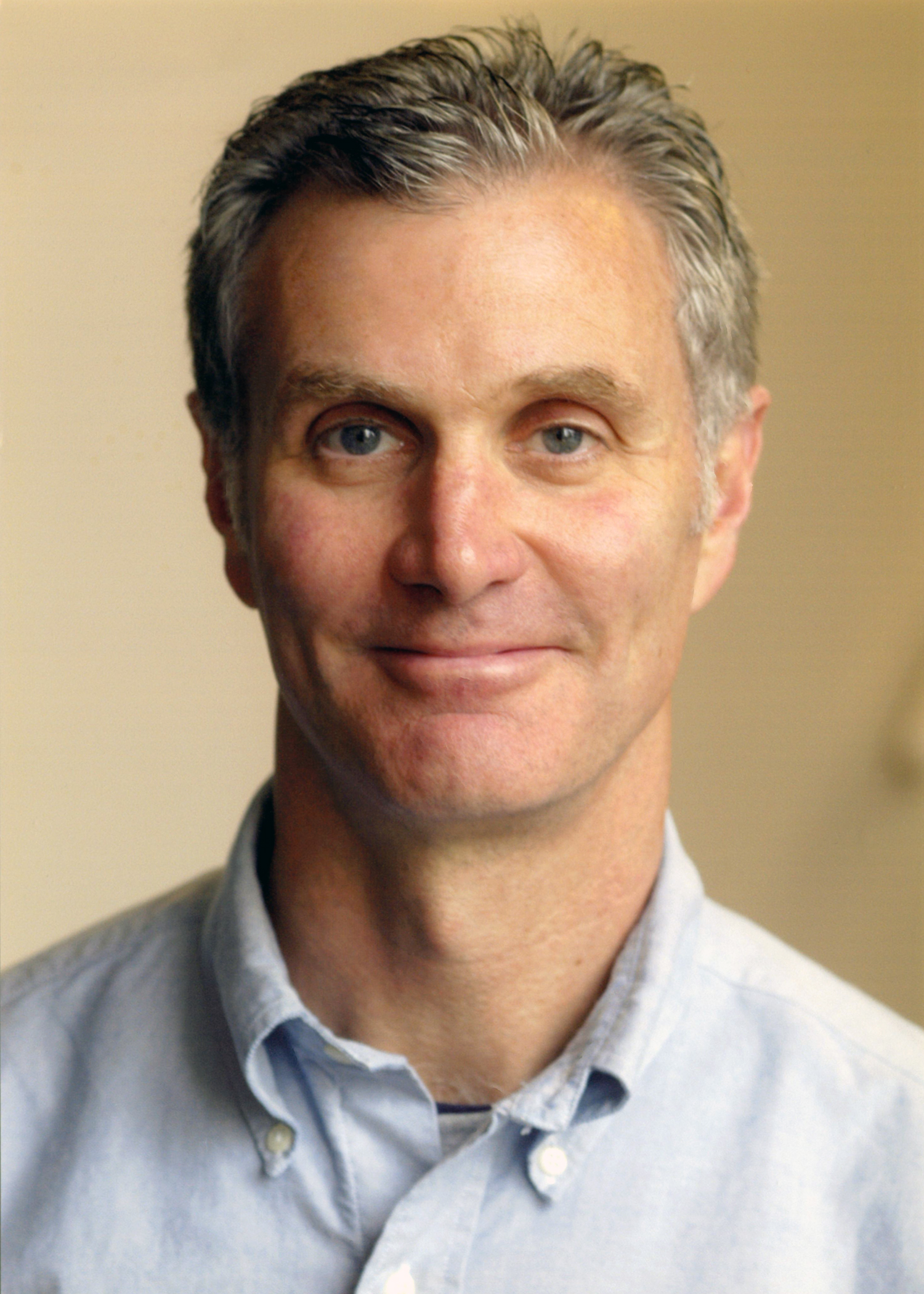
- Born: 1953 (age 72–73); Philadelphia, United States
- Occupations: Philosopher, writer
- Employer: Seattle University
- Known for: Philosophy of religion, process philosophy, animal rights, vegetarianism
- Notable work: The Philosophy of Vegetarianism; Babies and Beasts: The Argument from Marginal Cases; Rethinking the Ontological Argument; Contemporary Athletics and Ancient Greek Ideals
- Title: Professor emeritus of philosophy

Daniel A. Dombrowski (born 1953) is an American philosopher and professor emeritus of philosophy at Seattle University. He has served as editor of the journal Process Studies since 2009, and is a past president of the Metaphysical Society of America (2018–19).

== Education ==
Dombrowski received a Bachelor of Arts degree from the University of Maine in 1974 and a Ph.D. from Saint Louis University in 1978.

== Career ==
Dombrowski began his academic career at Saint Joseph's University in Philadelphia, where he taught from 1978 to 1982 and held the rank of assistant professor. He subsequently joined Creighton University, where he taught from 1982 to 1988 and attained the rank of associate professor. In 1988, he joined Seattle University, where he served as a professor of philosophy until 2026.

Throughout his teaching career, Dombrowski has taught courses in ethics, metaphysics, philosophy of religion, ancient and medieval philosophy, philosophy of history, philosophy of science, political philosophy, environmental ethics, business ethics, and the philosophy of peace and war. At Seattle University, his teaching also included courses on John Rawls, critical thinking, philosophy of the human person, and process philosophy and religion, as well as courses offered through the university's honors, executive leadership, and international programs.

Dombrowski has served as editor of Process Studies, a peer-reviewed journal devoted to the study of the thought and implications of Alfred North Whitehead, Charles Hartshorne, and related traditions in process philosophy and theology. He has held the position since 2009.

He served as president of the Metaphysical Society of America in 2018–2019. The society's 2019 annual meeting, held at Seattle University, identified Dombrowski as its president and conference host.

== Scholarship ==
Dombrowski's scholarship spans process metaphysics, philosophy of religion, political philosophy, ancient philosophy, ethics, and the philosophy of sport. He has written more than twenty books and more than 200 scholarly articles in philosophy, theology, classics, and literature.

A substantial part of his work concerns process philosophy and neoclassical theism, particularly the thought of Alfred North Whitehead and Charles Hartshorne. His books, including Analytic Theism, Hartshorne, and the Concept of God (1996), Divine Beauty: The Aesthetics of Charles Hartshorne (2004), A Platonic Philosophy of Religion: A Process Perspective (2005), Rethinking the Ontological Argument: A Neoclassical Theistic Response (2006), A History of the Concept of God: A Process Approach (2016), Whitehead's Religious Thought (2017), and Process Mysticism (2023), examine questions in metaphysics, theism, religious experience, and mysticism. Dombrowski is widely recognized as the world’s leading expert on the thought of Charles Hartshorne, in particular, and a major interpreter and defender of process thought, in general.

Another major area of his work is political liberalism and its relationship to religion. In Rawls and Religion: The Case for Political Liberalism (2001), Rawlsian Explorations in Religion and Applied Philosophy (2011), and Process Philosophy and Political Liberalism: Rawls, Whitehead, Hartshorne (2019), he examined the relationship between John Rawls's political philosophy, religious belief, and process thought. His scholarship on ancient philosophy includes Plato's Philosophy of History (1981) and Pre-Liberal Political Philosophy: Rawls and Plato, Aristotle, Augustine, Aquinas (2022).

His works in these areas include Christian Pacifism (1991), and Contemporary Athletics and Ancient Greek Ideals (2009). His 2026 book, The Way of Reason in Religion and Politics: The Philosophy of Franklin I. Gamwell, examines the relationship between reason, religion, metaphysics, and democratic political thought through the work of Franklin I. Gamwell.

=== Animal rights and vegetarianism ===
Dombrowski has authored several books dealing with the topics of animal rights and vegetarianism, including Hartshorne and the Metaphysics of Animal Rights (1988), The Philosophy of Vegetarianism(1984). It documents the arguments for vegetarianism from Pythagoras through the Hellenistic period to the modern debates on vegetarianism. It was positively reviewed as an "extremely well documented work". Dombrowski's Babies and Beasts: The Argument from Marginal Cases, published in 1997 is the first book-length examination of the range of views relating to the argument from marginal cases. The book analyzes the arguments of Peter Singer, Tom Regan, H. J. McCloskey, Jan Narveson, John Rawls, R. G. Frey, Peter Carruthers, Michael P. T. Leahy, Robert Nozick, and James Rachels.

== Selected publications ==
- Plato's Philosophy of History (Washington, DC: University Press of America, 1981), 217 pp.
- The Philosophy of Vegetarianism (Amherst: University of Massachusetts Press, 1984), 188 pp. Also Vegetarianism: The Philosophy Behind the Ethical Diet (London: Thorsons, 1985), 188 pp. Foreword by Peter Singer.
- Thoreau the Platonist (NY, Berne, and Frankfurt: Verlag Peter Lang, 1986), 219 pp.
- Hartshorne and the Metaphysics of Animal Rights (Albany: State University of New York Press, 1988), 159 pp.
- Christian Pacifism (Philadelphia: Temple University Press, 1991), 181 pp.
- St. John of the Cross: An Appreciation (Albany: State University of New York Press, 1992), 219 pp.
- Analytic Theism, Hartshorne, and the Concept of God (Albany: State University of New York Press, 1996), 247 pp.
- Babies and Beasts: The Argument from Marginal Cases (Champaign: University of Illinois Press, 1997), 221 pp.
- Kazantzakis and God (Albany: State University of New York Press, 1997), 193 pp.
- A Brief, Liberal, Catholic Defense of Abortion, with Robert Deltete (Champaign: University of Illinois Press, 2000), 158 pp.
- Not Even a Sparrow Falls: The Philosophy of Stephen R. L. Clark (East Lansing: Michigan State University Press, 2000), 366 pp.
- Rawls and Religion: The Case for Political Liberalism (Albany: State University of New York Press, 2001), 192 pp.
- Divine Beauty: The Aesthetics of Charles Hartshorne (Nashville: Vanderbilt University Press, 2004), 230 pp.
- A Platonic Philosophy of Religion: A Process Perspective (Albany: State University of New York Press, 2005), 152 pp.
- Rethinking the Ontological Argument: A Neoclassical Theistic Perspective (Cambridge: Cambridge University Press, 2006), 172 pp.
- Contemporary Athletics and Ancient Greek Ideals (Chicago: University of Chicago Press, 2009), 167 pp.
- Rawlsian Explorations in Religion and Applied Philosophy (University Park: Pennsylvania State University Press, 2011), 138 pp.
- A History of the Concept of God: A Process Approach (Albany: State University of New York Press, 2016), 273 pp.
- Whitehead's Religious Thought: From Mechanism to Organism, From Force to Persuasion (Albany: State University of New York Press, 2017), 184 pp.
- Process Philosophy and Political Liberalism: Rawls, Whitehead, Hartshorne (Edinburgh: Edinburgh University Press, 2019), 214 pp.
- Process Mysticism (Albany: State University of New York Press, 2023), 231 pp.
- The Way of Reason in Religion and Politics: The philosophy of Franklin I. Gamwell. (Albany, NY: State University of New York Press, 2026)
