= The Paradox of Anti-Semitism =

2006 book by Dan Cohn-Sherbok

- Author: Dan Cohn-Sherbok
- Language: English
- Subject: Antisemitism
- Genre: Non-fiction
- Publication date: 2006

The Paradox of Anti-Semitism is a book written by American Reform Rabbi Dan Cohn-Sherbok and published in 2006. The book primarily asserts that antisemitism has served as a useful external reinforcement for Jewish culture in the diaspora, and that the lack of such external persecutions and antagonisms results in the dissolution of Jewish identity and assimilation.

The book was criticized by former Board of Deputies of British Jews (BDBJ) president Lord Janner, who classified antisemitism as an "unmitigated evil". Furthermore, Brian Klug of Catalyst, in his review of the book, referred to Cohn-Sherbok's views as being reflective of what Salo Wittmayer Baron called the lachrymose conception of Jewish history (a view rejected by Baron), retorted that Cohn-Sherbok's depiction of a decline of Jewish identity and cohesion in the West was at odds with the view that the non-monolithic Jewish culture was diversified, evolved and enriched by the relative lack of antisemitism in religiously pluralistic places like the United States

== See also ==
- The Vanishing American Jew, by Alan Dershowitz, which makes similar claims under the term "Tsuris Theory of Jewish Survival
- Anti-Semite and Jew, by Jean-Paul Sartre
