= Dan Cohn-Sherbok =

American rabbi and scholar (born 1945)

Dan Mark Cohn-Sherbok
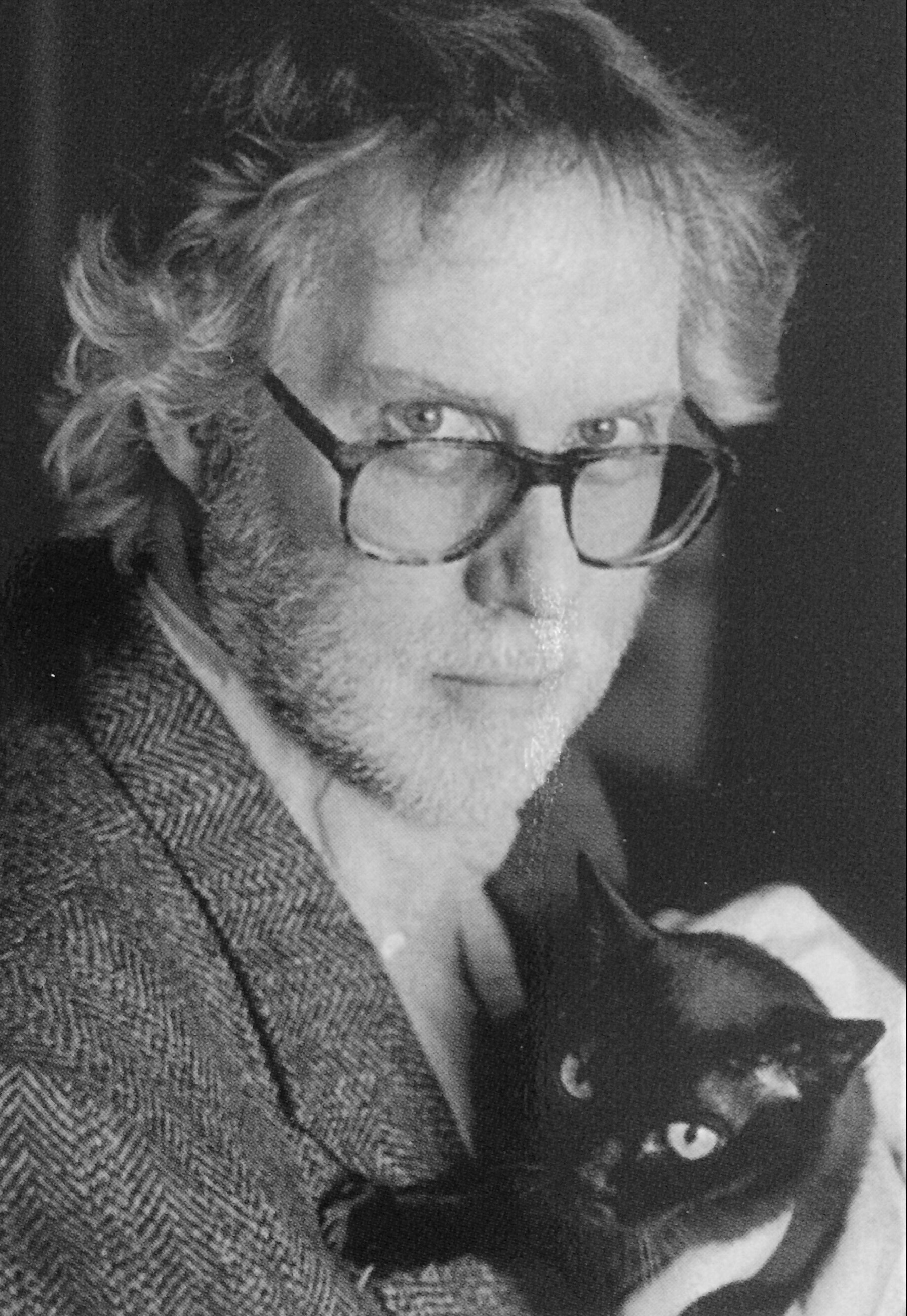
- Born: February 1, 1945 (age 81); Denver, Colorado, US
- Title: Professor Emeritus of Judaism at the University of Wales
- Spouse: Lavinia Cohn-Sherbok

Academic background
- Education: Williams College, Wolfson College, Cambridge
- Alma mater: Wolfson College, Cambridge

Academic work
- Discipline: Biblical and Jewish studies
- Institutions: University of Kent; University of Wales

Dan Mark Cohn-Sherbok (born 1 February 1945) is a rabbi of Reform Judaism and a Jewish theologian. He is professor emeritus of Judaism at the University of Wales.

== Early life and education ==
Born into a Jewish family on February 1, 1945 in Denver, Colorado, Cohn-Sherbok was the son of Bernard Sherbok, an orthopedic surgeon, and Ruth Sherbok (née Goldstein). His family roots were in New York City and Hungary. He graduated from East High School (Denver) and was a student at Williams College, Massachusetts, spending a junior year abroad in Athens, Greece.

Cohn-Sherbok was conceived through sperm donation and artificial insemination at the University of Chicago Medical School. In interviews he has expressed gratitude for his conception and said learning of it in his twenties clarified his strained relationship with his father. However, he has also described his discovery as "traumatic" and said that it initially caused confusion about his identity.

== Career ==
He was ordained a Reform rabbi at the Hebrew Union College at Cincinnati. He was a Chaplain of the Colorado House of Representative, and Honorary Colonel Aide-de-Camp of New Mexico. He has served as a rabbi in the United States, England, Australia and South Africa. He was a student at Wolfson College, Cambridge. He received a doctorate in philosophy from the University of Cambridge in England. Later, he received an honorary doctorate in divinity from the Hebrew Union College-Jewish Institute of Religion, New York City. He taught theology at the University of Kent and served as director of the Centre for the Study of Religion and Society, and was Professor of Judaism at the University of Wales. He has served as visiting professor at University of Essex, Middlesex University, St. Andrews University, Durham University, University of Vilnius, Lithuania, Charles University, Prague, York St John University, Trinity University College, St Mary's University, Twickenham, New Saint Andrews College and Honorary Professor at Aberystwyth University.

He has been a visiting fellow at Wolfson College, Cambridge, and Harris Manchester College, Oxford, a Fellow of the Royal Asiatic Society, a Fellow of the Royal Society of Arts, a Corresponding Fellow of the Academy of Jewish Philosophy, a visiting research fellow of Heythrop College, University of London, a Life Member of Wolfson College, Cambridge, an Honorary Senior Member of Darwin College, University of Kent, an Associate Member of the SCR Christ Church, Oxford, a Member of the SCR Harris Manchester College, Oxford, President of the London Society for the Study of Religion and Member of the Arts and Humanities Peer Review College. He has also served as a visiting scholar of Mansfield College, Oxford, the Oxford Centre for Postgraduate Hebrew Studies and Sarum College. He was a finalist of the Times Preacher of the Year, and winner of the Royal Academy Friends design competition. He is a member of the Oxford and Cambridge Club and the Athenaeum.

== Controversial views ==
Cohn-Sherbok has written and lectured on a number of provocative topics that have stirred controversy in the broader Jewish community, including the legitimacy of Messianic Judaism, the equal standing of Humanistic Judaism with other Jewish movements, the purported benefits of Antisemitism, and the growing influence of Christian Zionism.

== Personal life ==
He is married to Lavinia Cohn-Sherbok.

== Works ==
Cohn-Sherbok is the author and editor of over 100 books, which have been translated into Russian, Greek, Bulgarian, Hebrew, French, Portuguese, Spanish, Italian, Chinese, Swedish, Japanese, Romanian, Turkish, Persian and German. He has also illustrated 25 books with cartoons and has contributed cartoons to books and magazines. His books include:

- Cohn-Sherbok, Dan (1984). The Jews of Canterbury 1760-1931. Seattle, WA ?: Yorick Books. ISBN 978-0-947-71001-9.
- ———; Irwin, Michael, eds. (1987). Exploring Reality. London: Allen & Unwin. ISBN 978-0-041-00050-4.
- ——— (1987). On Earth as It Is in Heaven: Jews, Christians and Liberation Theology. Maryknoll, NY: Orbis Books. ISBN 978-0-883-44410-8.
- ——— (1989). The Jewish Heritage. Oxford: Blackwell. ISBN 978-0-631-15414-3.
- ——— (1989). Holocaust Theology: A Reader. London: Lamp Press. ISBN 978-0-551-01829-7.
- ——— (1989). Jewish Petitionary Prayer: A Theological Exploration. Toronto Studies in Theology. Lewiston, New York; Lampeter, Wales: Edwin Mellen Press. ISBN 978-0-889-46781-1.
- ——— (1989). God and the Holocaust. Herefordshire: Gracewing Publishers. ISBN 978-0-852-44341-5.
- ———, ed. (1990). The Canterbury Papers: Essays on Religion and Society. London: Bellew Publishing. ISBN 978-0-947-79244-2.
- ———, ed. (1990). The Salman Rushdie Controversy in Inter-religious Perspective. Lewiston, New York; Lampeter, Wales: Edwin Mellen Press. ISBN 978-0-889-46719-4.
- ——— (1990). Rabbinic Perspectives on the New Testament. Lewiston, New York; Lampeter, Wales: Edwin Mellen Press. ISBN 978-0-889-46689-0.
- ———, ed. (1991). Islam in a World of Diverse Faiths. Library of Philosophy and Religion. Macmillan Academic and Professional Ltd. ISBN 978-0-333-69067-3.
- ———, ed. (1991). A Traditional Quest: Essays in Honour of Louis Jacobs. Sheffield: JSOT Press. ISBN 978-1-850-75279-0.
- ———, ed. (1991). The Sayings of Moses. Gerald Duckworth & Co. ISBN 978-0-715-62375-6.
- ———, ed. (1991). Problems in Contemporary Jewish Theology. Lewiston, New York; Lampeter, Wales: Edwin Mellen Press. ISBN 978-0-773-49645-3.
- ——— (1991). Issues in Contemporary Judaism. Macmillan. ISBN 978-1-349-21330-6.
- ———, ed. (1991). Tradition and Unity: Sermons Published in Honour of Robert Runcie. Canterbury Papers. Lewiston, New York; Lampeter, Wales: Edwin Mellen Press. ISBN 978-0-947-79261-9.
- ———, ed. (1991). Using the Bible Today. Lewiston, New York; Lampeter, Wales: Edwin Mellen Press. ISBN 978-0-947-79295-4.
- ——— (1991). Dictionary of Judaism and Christianity. Philadelphia: Trinity Press. ISBN 978-1-563-38030-3. OCLC 23972715.
- ——— (1992). Exodus: An Agenda for Jewish-Christian Dialogue. London: Bellew Publishing. ISBN 978-1-857-25033-6.
- ———, ed. (1992). World Religions and Human Liberation. Maryknoll, NY: Orbis Books. ISBN 978-0-883-44795-6.
- ———, ed. (1992). Many Mansions: Interfaith and Religious Intolerance. London: Bellew Publishing. ISBN 978-1-857-25044-2.
- ——— (1992). The Blackwell Dictionary of Judaica. Oxford: Blackwell. ISBN 978-0-631-16615-3.
- ——— (1992). The Crucified Jew: Twenty Centuries of Christian Anti-Semitism. London: Fount. ISBN 978-0002159944.
- ——— (1992). Israel: The History of an Idea. London: SPCK Publishing. ISBN 978-0-281-04577-8.
- ———, ed. (1992). Torah and Revelation. Studies in Jewish Theology. Lewiston, New York; Lampeter, Wales: Edwin Mellen Press. ISBN 978-0-773-49165-6.
- ——— (1993). The Jewish Faith. London: SPCK Publishing. ISBN 978-0-281-04685-0.
- ——— (1993). Not a Job for a Nice Jewish Boy. London: Bellew Publishing. ISBN 978-1-857-25069-5.
- ———; Cohn-Sherbok, Lavinia (1994). Jewish and Christian Mysticism: an Introduction. London: Continuum Co. ISBN 978-0-826-40695-8. OCLC 889692769.
- ——— (1994). Judaism and Other Faiths. Palgrave Macmillan. ISBN 978-0-333-57523-9.
- ——— (1994). The Future of Judaism. London: T & T Clark. ISBN 978-0-567-29267-4.
- ———; Cohn-Sherbok, Lavinia (1994). Judaism: A Short History. Oxford: Oneworld Publishing. ISBN 978-1-851-68206-5.
- ——— (1994). Atlas of Jewish History. Routledge. ISBN 978-0-415-08684-4.
- ——— (1994). World Religions and Human Liberation. Maryknoll, NY: Orbis Books. ISBN 978-0-883-44796-3.
- ———; Cohn-Sherbok, Lavinia (1994). The American Jew. Harper Collins; STL. ISBN 978-0-006-27687-6.
- ———, ed. (1994). Glimpses of God. Duckworth. ISBN 978-0-715-62608-5.
- Cohn-Sherbok, Lavinia; ——— (1995). A Popular Dictionary of Judaism. Surrey: Curzon Press. ISBN 0-7007-0357-8.
- ———; Lewis, Christopher (1995). Beyond Death: Theological and Philosophical Reflections on Life after Death. Palgrave Schol. ISBN 978-0-333-63073-0.
- ———, ed. (1997). Theodicy. Lewiston, New York; Lampeter, Wales: Edwin Mellen Press. ISBN 978-0-773-48690-4.
- ———; Cohn-Sherbok, Lavinia (1996). A Short Reader in Judaism. Richmond: Curzon Press. ISBN 978-1-851-68278-2.
- ——— (1996). Modern Judaism: From Jewish Diversity to a New Philosophy of Judaism. St. Martin's Press. ISBN 978-0-312-16188-0.
- ——— (1996). The Hebrew Bible. Cassell. ISBN 978-0-304-33703-3.
- ——— (1996). Biblical Hebrew for Beginners. London: SPCK Publishing. ISBN 978-0-281-04818-2.
- ——— (1996). Medieval Jewish Philosophy: An Introduction. Routledge. ISBN 978-0-700-70453-8.
- ———; Leahy, Michael (1996). The Liberation Debate. Routledge. ISBN 978-0-415-11693-0.
- ———, ed. (1996). Divine Intervention and Miracles in Jewish Theology. Jewish Studies. Lewiston, New York; Lampeter, Wales: Edwin Mellen Press. ISBN 978-0-773-49093-2.
- ——— (1997). The Crucified Jew: Twenty Centuries of Christian Anti-Semitism (U.S. reissue ed.). Grand Rapids, MI: Eerdmans. ISBN 978-0-802-84311-1.
- ——— (1997). Fifty Key Jewish Thinkers. Routledge. ISBN 978-0-415-12627-4.
- ———; Linzey, Andrew (1997). After Noah: Animals and the Liberation of Theology. Mowbray. ISBN 978-0-264-67450-6.
- ———; Cohn-Sherbok, Lavinia (1997). A Short Introduction to Judaism. Oxford: Oneworld Publishing. ISBN 978-1-851-68145-7.
- ——— (1998). A Concise Encyclopedia of Judaism. Oxford: Oneworld Publishing. ISBN 978-1-851-68176-1.
- ———, ed. (1999). The Future of Jewish-Christian Dialogue. Toronto Studies in Theology. Lewiston, New York; Lampeter, Wales: Edwin Mellen Press. ISBN 978-0-773-47923-4.
- ———, ed. (1999). Jews, Christians and Religious Pluralism. Toronto Studies in Theology. Lewiston, New York; Lampeter, Wales: Edwin Mellen Press. ISBN 978-0-773-47920-3.
- ——— (1999). Judaism. Religions of the World. Prentice Hall. ISBN 978-0-132-66271-0.
- ———; Lamb, Christopher, eds. (1999). The Future of Religion: Postmodern Perspectives - Essays in Honour of Ninian Smart. Hendon, London: Middlesex University Press. ISBN 978-1-898-25326-6.
- ———, ed. (1999). Understanding the Holocaust: An Introduction. Issues in contemporary religion. Cassell. ISBN 978-0-304-70442-2.
- ——— (2000). Messianic Judaism. London; New York: Continuum. ISBN 978-0-826-45458-4.
- ———, ed. (2001). Interfaith Theology: A Reader. Oxford: Oneworld Publishing. ISBN 978-1-851-68276-8.
- ———, ed. (2001). Voices of Messianic Judaism: Confronting Critical Issues Facing a Modern Movement. Clarksville, MD: Messianic Jewish Publishers. ISBN 978-1-880-22693-3.
- ———; Court, John, eds. (2001). Religious Diversity in the Graeco-Roman World: A Survey of Recent Scholarship. Understanding the Bible and Its World. Sheffield: Sheffield Academic Press. ISBN 978-1-841-27216-0.
- ———; El-Alami, Dawoud (2001). The Palestine-Israeli Conflict: a Beginner's Guide. Oxford: Oneworld Publishing. ISBN 978-1-851-68261-4.
- ——— (2002). Anti-Semitism. Sutton Publishing. ISBN 978-0-750-92492-4.
- ———, ed. (2002). Holocaust Theology: a Reader (Reissue ed.). New York: New York University Press. ISBN 978-0-814-71620-5.
- ——— (2003). Judaism: History, Belief and Practice. Routledge. ISBN 978-0-415-23661-4.
- ———; Cook, Harry; Rowens, Marilyn, eds. (2003). A Life of Courage: Sherwin Wine and Humanistic Judaism. Milan Press. ISBN 978-0-967-32596-5.
- ——— (2003). What's a Nice Jewish Boy Doing in a Place Like This?. O Books. ISBN 978-1-903-81618-9.
- ——— (2004). Vision of Judaism: Wrestling with God. Paragon House Publishers. ISBN 978-1-557-78808-5.
- ——— (2005). Dictionary of Jewish Biography. Oxford: Oxford University Press. ISBN 978-0-195-22391-0.
- ———; Grey, Mary (2005). Pursuing the Dream: A Jewish-Christian Conversation. Darton, Longman & Todd. ISBN 978-0-232-52540-3.
- ——— (2006). The Paradox of Anti-Semitism. London: Continuum. ISBN 978-0826488961.
- ——— (2006). Kabbalah and Jewish Mysticism: An Introductory Anthology. Oxford: Oneworld Publishing. ISBN 978-1-851-68454-0.
- ——— (2006). The Politics of Apocalypse: The History and Influence of Christian Zionism. Oxford: Oneworld Publishing. ISBN 978-1-851-68453-3.
- ———; Cohn-Sherbok, Lavinia (2007). What Do You Do When Your Parents Live Forever?: A Practical Guide to Caring for the Elderly. O Books. ISBN 978-1-846-94028-6.
- ——— (2009). Dictionary of Kabbalah and Kabbalists. Impress Books. ISBN 978-0-955-62397-4.
- ——— (2010). Judaism Today. Religion Today series. London; New York: Continuum. ISBN 978-0-826-42231-6.
- ——— (2011). Introduction to Zionism and Israel: From Ideology to History. London: Continuum. ISBN 978-1-441-12757-0.
- ——— (2012). The Palestinian State: A Jewish Justification. Impress Books. ISBN 978-1-907-60529-1.
- ———; El-Alami, Dawoud; Chryssides, George (2013). Love, Sex and Marriage:Insights from Judaism, Christianity and Islam. London: SCM Press. ISBN 978-0-334-04405-5.
- ——— (2013). Eternal Angels. London: Duerr Publishing.
- ——— (2013). The Illustrated History of Judaism. London: Lorenz Books. ISBN 978-0-754-82356-8.
- ——— (2014). Williams College Alumni Cartoons. London: Duerr Publishing.
- ——— (2014). Animals are People Too. London: Duerr Publishing.
- ———; Lewis, Christopher (2014). Sensible Religion. Routledge. ISBN 978-1-409-46808-0.
- ———; El-Alami, Dawoud; Chryssides, George (2014). Why Can't They Get Along?. London: Lion Books. ISBN 978-0-745-95605-3.
- ———; Grey, Mary (2014). Debating Palestine and Israel. Impress Books. ISBN 978-1-907-60549-9.
- ——— (2014). The Athenaeum Sketches. Impress Books. ISBN 978-1-907-60548-2.
- ——— (2015). History of the Jewish Faith. Southwater. ISBN 978-1-780-19422-6.
- ———; El-Alami, Dawoud; Chryssides, George (2016). Terror and Religion: An Interfaith Dialogue. Impress Books. ISBN 978-1-907-60596-3.
- ——— (2016). The Perplexities of Being an Amateur Artist. London: Duerr Publishing.
- ——— (2016). Judaism Belief and Practice. Southwater. ISBN 978-1-780-19509-4.
- ——— (2018). A Dictionary of Jews and Jewish Life. Impress Books. ISBN 978-1-911293-21-7.
- ——— (2018). London Clubs. London: Duerr Publishing.
- ———; Hasan, Usama; Chryssides, George (2019). People of the Book. JKP. ISBN 978-1-907-60596-3.
- ———; Cave, Peter; Chryssides (2019). Jews:Nearly everything you wanted to know but were too afraid to ask. Equinox. ISBN 978-1-78179-777-8.
- ———- (2019) Cohn-Sherbok, Lewis, Christopher, Interfaith Worship and Prayer, JKP. ISBN 978-1-78592-120-9.
- ———-(2020) Cohn-Sherbok, Dan, Cardozo Kindersley, Lida, The Alphabetician and the Rabbi, Cardozo Kindersley.
- ———-(2020) Cohn-Sherbok, Cave, Peter, Arguing About Judaism, Routledge. ISBN 978-0-367-33406-2
- ———- (2020) Cohn-Sherbok, Grant, Kevin, The Animal Orchestra, Words. ISBN 978-0-9529352-3-0.
- ———- (2021) Cohn-Sherbok, Dan, Jews and Jokes, Impress Books
- ———- (2022) Cohn-Sherbok, Dan, Antisemitism, The History Press
- ————(2023) Cohn-Sherbok, Dan, Chryssides, George (eds), The Covid Pandemic and the World's Religions, Bloomsbury
- ———— (2024) Cohn-Sherbok, Dan, Oxford and Cambridge Club Jigsaws, ISSUU
- ————-(2024) Cohn-Sherbok, Dan, The Athenaeum, ISSUU
- ————(2024) Cohn-Sherbok, Dan, Grant, Kevin, Bible Jigsaws, ISSUU
- ————(2024) Cohn-Sherbok, Dan, Jew Hatred, ISSUU
- ————(2024) Cohn-Sherbok, Dan, Defining Antisemitism, ISSUU
- ————(2024), Cohn-Sherbok, Dan, The Bible and the Holy Land, ISSUU

== See also ==
- Carol Harris-Shapiro
- Academic study of new religious movements
