= Lavinia Cohn-Sherbok =

English writer

Lavinia Cohn-Sherbok (born Surrey, England) is a novelist, the author of numerous books about Judaism and Christianity, and was the Principal of West Heath Girls' School.

== Biography ==
She was educated at Benenden School, Girton College, Cambridge, and the University of Kent, Canterbury. She taught at South Hampstead High School, London, King's School, Canterbury, and in 1988 became Principal of West Heath School, Sevenoaks, England.

She is the author of three best-selling comic campus novels, which lament the decline of British universities. In addition, she has written a number of books dealing with Judaism and Christianity. She is also Judaism editor of the Encyclopedia of World's Religions (Oxford University Press).

She is married to Dan Cohn-Sherbok.

== Bibliography ==
- Lavinia and Dan Cohn-Sherbok, The American Jew, paperback ed., Harper Collins, 1994
- Lavinia and Dan Cohn-Sherbok, A Short History of Judaism, Paperback, ed., Oneworld, 1994
- Lavinia Cohn-Sherbok; Dan Cohn-Sherbok (1994). Jewish and Christian Mysticism. Continuum. ISBN 978-0-8264-0695-8.
- Lavinia and Dan Cohn-Sherbok, A Short Reader of Judaism, Paperback ed., Oneworld, 1996
- Lavinia and Dan Cohn-Sherbok, A Short Introduction to Judaism, Paperback ed., Oneworld, 1997
- Lavinia Cohn-Sherbok, A History of Jewish Civilization, Hardback ed., Grange Books, 1997
- Lavinia Cohn-Sherbok, Routledge Who's Who in Christianity, Hardback ed., Routledge, 1998
- Lavinia and Dan Cohn-Sherbok, Encyclopedia of Judaism and Christianity, Paetback ed., DLT, 2006
- Lavinia Cohn-Sherbok, A Campus Conspiracy, Paperback ed., Impress Books, 2006
- Lavinia and Dan Cohn-Sherbok, What Do You Do When Your Parents Live Forever?, Paperback ed., 2007
- Lavinia Cohn-Sherbok, Degrees R'Us, Paperback ed., Impress Books, 2007
- Lavinia Cohn-Sherbok, The Whistleblower, Paperback ed., Impress Books, 2008
- Lavinia Cohn-Sherbok, The Campus Trilogy, Paperback ed., Impress Books, 2010
- Lavinia Cohn-Sherbok; Dan Cohn-Sherbok (1997). A Popular Dictionary of Judaism. Psychology Press. ISBN 978-0-7007-1047-8.
- Lavinia Cohn-Sherbok, The Philosopher Cat, ebook, 2014
