= Moral status of animals in the ancient world =

Contemporary debates about animal welfare and animal rights can be traced back to ancient history. Records from as early as the 6th century before the common era (BCE) include discussions of animal ethics in Jain and Greek texts. The relations between humans and nonhumans are also discussed in the books of Exodus and Genesis, Jewish writings from the 6th or 5th century BCE.

== Hinduism and Buddhism ==
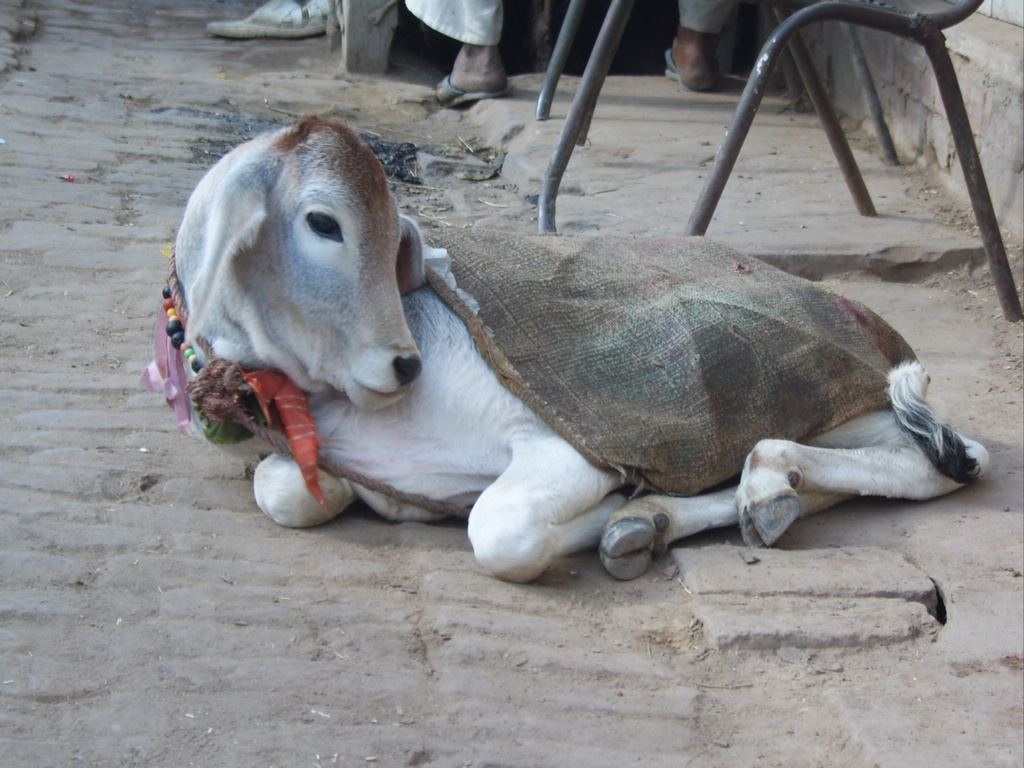
A cow resting on a street in Vrindavan, India, free to wander around

The earliest reference to the idea of non-violence to animals (pashu-ahimsa), apparently in a moral sense, is in the Hindu text of Kapisthala Katha Samhita of the Yajurveda (KapS 31.11), written about the 8th century BCE. Both Hindu and Buddhist societies saw widespread vegetarianism from the 3rd century BCE, in line with ahimsa, the doctrine of non-violence. Ryder writes that animals were thought to possess the same feelings as human beings, and several kings of ancient India built hospitals for sick animals. Human souls could be reborn as animals if they had behaved badly, with all souls regarded as part of the Supreme Being. Failing to observe the duty to care could lead to bad karma, which increased the likelihood of returning as an animal next time round.

== Jainism ==
Jainism, dating from the 6th century BCE, is the oldest religious philosophy which has advocated complete non-violence towards animals of all forms. The Jain concept ahiṃsā or non-violence is the first in the basic set of Principles of Jainism.

== Ancient Greek Philosophy ==
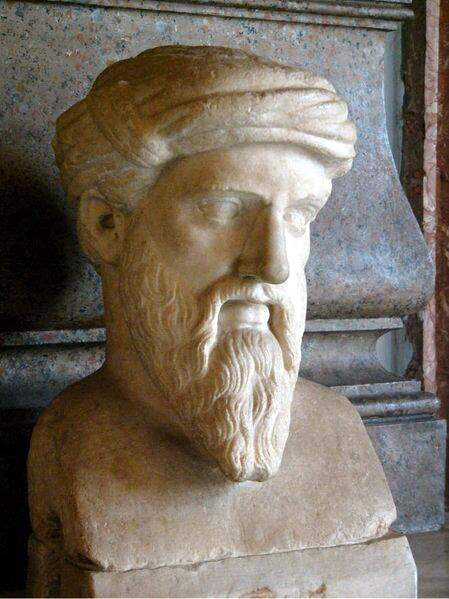
Pythagoras (c. 580–c.500 BCE)

Psychologist Richard Ryder, former Mellon Professor at Tulane University and chairman of the RSPCA in 1977, writes that it is in 6th century BCE Greek philosophy that we first find concern for the treatment of animals.

Four schools of thought were influential in ancient Greece: animism, vitalism, mechanism, and anthropocentrism. The philosopher and mathematician Pythagoras (c. 580–c. 500 BCE) was the central figure within animism. He urged respect for animals, because he believed that humans and non-humans had the same kind of soul, one spirit that pervades the universe and makes us one with animals. The souls were indestructible, made of fire and air, and were reincarnated from human to animal, or vice versa, the so-called transmigration of the soul. He was a vegetarian, and was reportedly the first animal "liberationist", buying animals from the market in order to set them free.

Against these ideas, Aristotle (384–322 BCE) argued that non-human animals had no interests of their own, ranking far below humans in the Great Chain of Being, or scala naturae, because of their alleged irrationality. He was the first to attempt the creation of a taxonomical categorization and hierarchy of animals. Aristotle perceived some similarities between humans and other species and developed a sort of "psychological continuum", recognising that human and non-human animals differ only by degree in possessing certain temperaments. Nevertheless, he denied animals rationality and moral equality. "Plants are created for the sake of animals," he wrote, "and animals for the sake of men." Aristotle argued that humans were the "masters" in his created hierarchical structure based upon their rational powers.

One of Aristotle's pupils, Theophrastus, argued against eating meat on the grounds that it robbed animals of life and was therefore unjust. He argued that non-human animals can reason, sense, and feel just as human beings do. Theophrastus did not prevail, and it was Aristotle's position—that human and non-human animals exist in different moral realms because one is rational and the other not—that persisted largely unchallenged in the West for nearly two thousand years.

== Judaism ==
While the first chapter of Book of Genesis describes how God gave human beings dominion over animals, this is tempered throughout the Torah by injunctions to show kindness and to respect animals. Severing a limb from a live animal and eating it was forbidden (Genesis 9:4), cattle were to be rested on Biblical Sabbath (Exodus 20:10; 23:12), a cow and her calf were not to be killed on the same day (Leviticus 22:28), a person had to feed his animals before himself (Deuteronomy 11:15), animal suffering had to be relieved (Deuteronomy 22:4), oxen treading the corn were not to be muzzled (Deuteronomy 25:4), kids were not to be cooked in their mother's milk (Deuteronomy 14:21), mother birds not to be disturbed while sitting on eggs (Deuteronomy 22:6-7), and oxen and asses not to be yoked together (Deuteronomy 22:10). In the opening chapters of Genesis, human beings are not permitted to eat meat at all, though after the Flood, meat-eating was permitted within certain limits.

The Jewish oral tradition developed the principle of Tza'ar ba'alei chayim, forbidding inflicting unnecessary pain on animals. This concept was accepted by the Talmud (Bava Metzia 32b) as being a Biblical mandate. It is linked in the Talmud from the Biblical law requiring people to assist in unloading burdens from animals (Exodus 23:5).

The Seven Laws of Noah, or the Noahide Laws, are a set of moral imperatives that, according to the Talmud, were given by God as a binding set of laws for the "children of Noah" – that is, all of humanity; the sixth law is: Do not eat of a live animal. This law is derived from Genesis 9:4, as interpreted in the Talmud (Sanhedrin 59a).

Compassion for animals is declared to have been the merit of Moses which made him the shepherd of his people (Exodus Rabbah 2), while Judah ha-Nasi saw in his own ailment the punishment for having once failed to show compassion for a frightened calf.

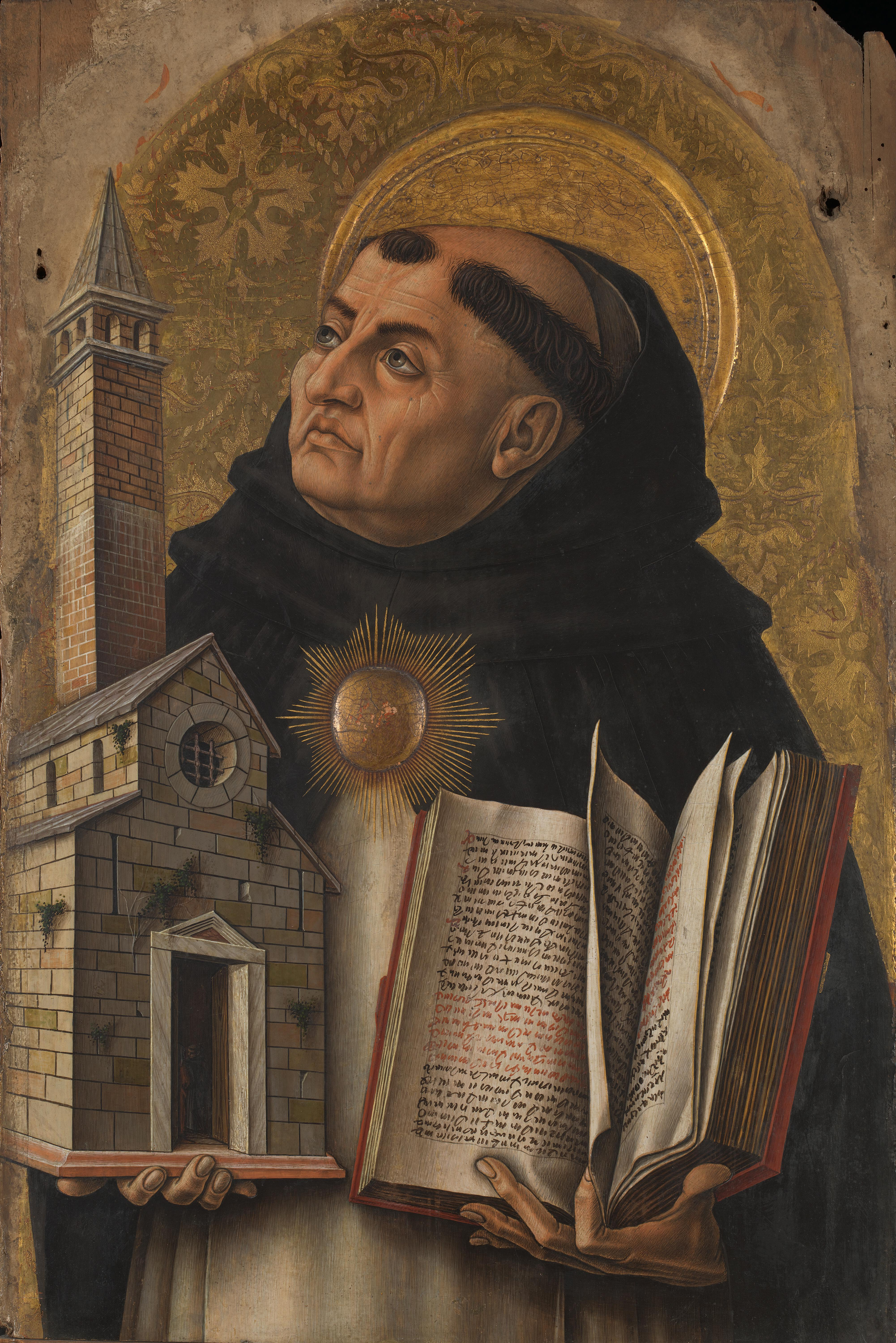
Saint Thomas Aquinas argued in the 13th century that humans should be kind to animals to make sure that cruel habits do not carry over into our treatment of other human beings, an argument that remains influential.

== Ancient Roman thought ==
Philosopher Peter Singer writes that animals, along with criminals and other undesirables, largely fell outside the Roman moral sphere. He quotes a description from the historian W.E.H. Lecky of the Roman games, first held in 366 BCE:

[E]very variety of atrocity was devised to stimulate flagging interest. At one time, a bear and a bull, chained together, rolled in fierce combat across the sand ... Four hundred bears were killed in a single day under Caligula [12–41] ... Under Nero [37–68], four hundred tigers fought with bulls and elephants. In a single day, at the dedication of the Colosseum by Titus [39–81], five thousand animals perished. Under Trajan [53–117] ... lions, tigers, elephants, rhinoceroses, hippopotami, giraffes, bulls, stags, even crocodiles and serpents were employed to give novelty to the spectacle ... So intense was the craving for blood, that a prince was less unpopular if he neglected the distribution of corn than if he neglected the games.

Meat eating was a status symbol, and animals were often cooked alive; Ryder writes that pigs were skewered alive on hot spits to improve the taste. He writes that there were nevertheless signs of tender feelings for animals in the poetry of Virgil (70–19 BCE), Lucretius (99–55 BCE), and Ovid (43 BCE–17 CE). The statesman Seneca (4 BCE–65 CE) was a vegetarian and said that he found the practice of vegetarianism not only moral but also delightful, as were the philosophers Plutarch (46–120 CE), Plotinus (205–270 CE), and Porphyry (232–305 CE). Porphyry wrote two tracts on the issue, De abstinentia (On Abstinence from Eating Animals) and De Non Necandis ad Epulandum Animantibus (On the Impropriety of Killing Living Beings for Food). Plutarch, who was Greek but lived in Rome, argued strongly against meat eating, seeing it as responsible for much of the cruelty in the world:

For the sake of some little mouthful of flesh, we deprive a soul of the sun and light ... And then we fancy that the voices it utters and screams forth to us are nothing else but certain inarticulate sounds and noises, and not the ... entreaties ... of each of them ...

=== Concept of "ius" ===
Legal philosopher John Finnis writes that the Romans invented the concept of "ius", meaning what is right, just, or lawful, and it is from this concept that the idea of a "right" as a claim, an entitlement, an immunity, or a liberty, arose in the late-medieval to modern period. He writes that it remains unclear how the concept of ius developed into the idea of modern rights, but a key feature of the latter is that the relationship between persons is articulated from the perspective of the relationship's beneficiary, the holder of the right. This is an important idea in the development of the concept of animal rights, the essence of which is to view the relationship between human and non-human from the perspective of the animal as beneficiary, rather than from the perspective of the human, which is how most animal protection legislation is framed. The idea is that any wrong not only "deforms the agent", as Finnis writes of human beings, but also offends the victim's "fundamental equality".

== Islam ==
Muhammad (570–632) taught that it was permissible to kill animals, but to do so unnecessarily or with cruelty was forbidden. "If you must kill, kill without torture." He saw animals as having internal mental states. They should not be bound when being slaughtered, and should not be made to wait. To let an animal see you sharpen your knife is to kill it twice.

== Polytheism ==
Some varieties of animism, totemism, religions of indigenous peoples, paganism and many versions of polytheism hold the belief that animals are spiritual beings; people practicing these belief systems have great respect towards the right to life of animals.

== See also ==
- Animal worship
- Intrinsic value (animal ethics)
