= Tarcisius Van Bavel =

Tarsicius Jan Van Bavel OSA (7 June 1923, Tilburg – 28 July 2007, Leuven) was a Belgian Catholic priest and Augustinian friar. He was one of the most important scholars in the thought of Augustine of Hippo. Van Bavel was Director of the Augustinian Historical Institute in Heverlee, Belgium, and Professor of Theology at the Katholieke Universiteit Leuven in Belgium.

van Bavel entered the Augustinian order in 1941. He defended his doctorate on the Christology of Augustine in 1954 at the University of Fribourg and was appointed professor at the KU Leuven in 1972. He was mostly known for his expertise on Augustine, but was also respected as a systematic theologian and wrote several texts on the religious life.
