= Michael P. T. Leahy =

English philosopher

- Born: 30 December 1934; Westminster
- Died: 7 May 2007 (aged 72)

Michael Paul Tutton Leahy (30 December 1934 – 7 May 2007) was an English conservative philosopher and opponent of animal rights and vegetarianism.

== Biography ==
Leahy was born in Westminster. He was educated Salesian College in Battersea and Trinity College, Dublin. After he graduated he studied at Cornell University and Penn State University. He was as assistant lecturer in philosophy at Durham University during 1965–1968 and a lecturer in philosophy at the University of Kent where he became a senior lecturer in 1976. He was the university’s admissions officer from 1992–1999.

He married Rosey Devitt in 1968, they had two children. Leahy suffered from dementia and was cared for by his wife.

== Criticism of animal rights ==
Leahy held the view that animals do not have moral rights and that humans tend to anthropomorphise animals by giving them cognitive and emotional capacities which they do not possess. He took influence from Ludwig Wittgenstein and argued that animals are "primitive beings" that lack beliefs and language, therefore they cannot have desires or interests. He stated that because animals lack language, they are not self-conscious and cannot be aware of what is in their interests, thus the idea of animal rights should be dismissed. He firmly rejected the idea that non-human animals deserve equal moral consideration.

Leahy's book Against Liberation, first published in 1991 and republished in 1993 was one of the first lengthy books to attack animal rights. The book was subjected to a fierce hate campaign from animal rights activists. Leahy has been described as "one of a group of right-wing philosophers who challenged the left-liberal consensus, and his opposition to animal rights inevitably excited the anger of campaigners." Wary of threats from animal rights activists, he was known to have checked his car and mail for bombs. On one occasion he called the bomb disposal unit about a suspicious package, but it turned out to be a pair of glasses from his optician.

== Selected publications ==
- Exploring Reality (with Dan Cohn-Sherbok and Michael Irwin, 1987)
- Against Liberation: Putting Animals in Perspective (1991, 1993)
- The Liberation Debate (with Dan Cohn-Sherbok, 1996)
