= William Alcott =

American physician (1798–1859)

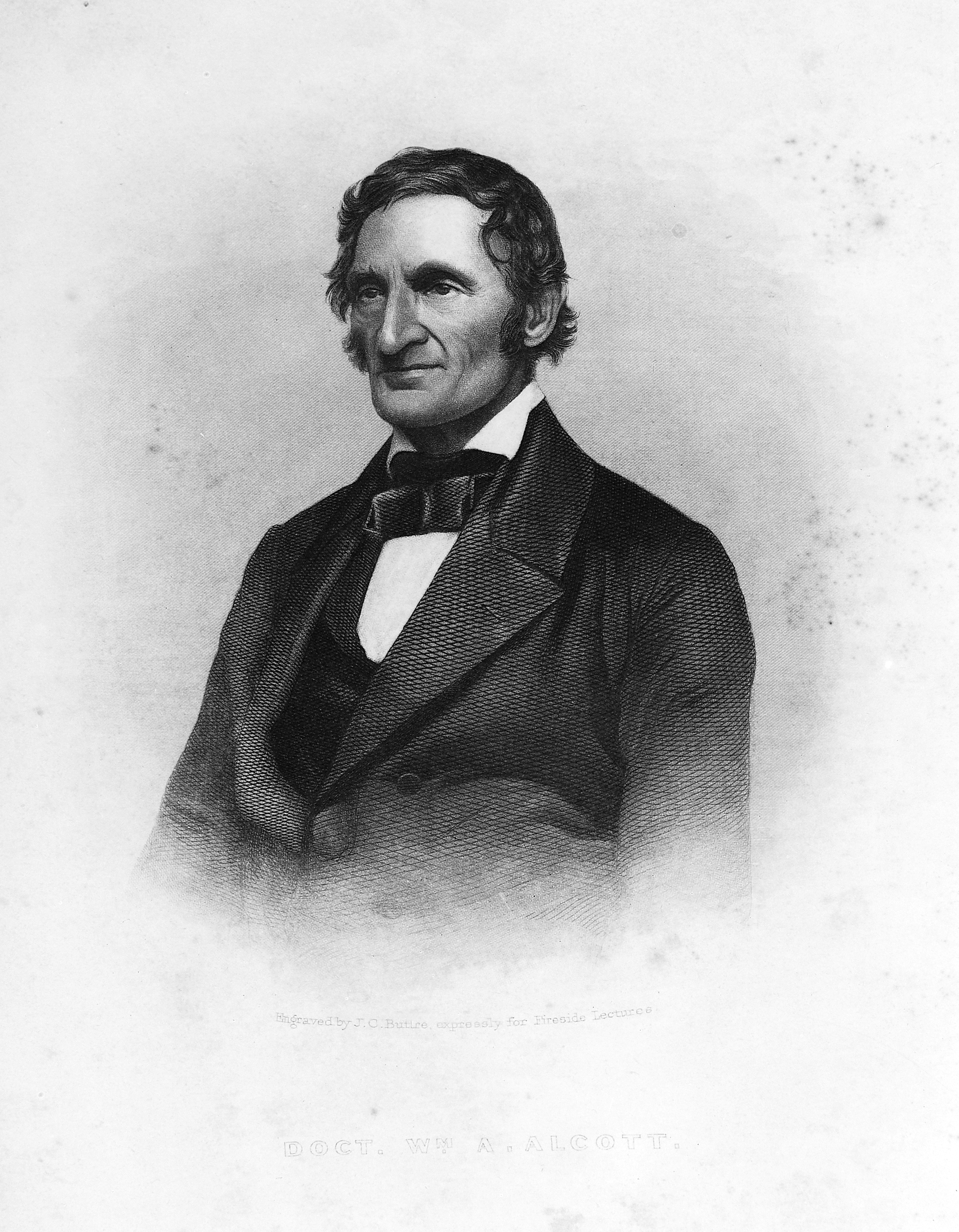
- Born: William Andrus Alcott; August 6, 1798; Wolcott, Connecticut, U.S.
- Died: March 29, 1859 (aged 60); Auburndale, Massachusetts, U.S.
- Other name: William Alexander Alcott
- Education: Yale School of Medicine
- Occupations: Educator, physician, author

William Andrus Alcott (August 6, 1798 – March 29, 1859), also known as William Alexander Alcott, was an American educator, educational reformer, medical doctor, vegetarian and writer. His works, which include a wide range of topics including educational reform, physical education, school house design, family life, and diet, are still widely cited today.

== Early life and family ==
William Alcott was born in Wolcott, Connecticut. His father, Obedience Alcox (1776–1847), was a farmer; in the 1820s, like many members of the family, he altered the spelling of his last name, which on his tombstone appears as "Obid. Alcott". (Note: Photographs are available on the commercial site Ancestry.com in several family trees) His mother was Anna Andrus (1777–1864), who was the daughter of a Revolutionary War soldier and William's most important educational influence. He attended local schools and became a close friend of his near neighbor Amos Bronson Alcott, who would later enjoy wide fame as a philosopher and as the father of writer Louisa May Alcott. Although sometimes described simply as "cousins" the two were actually second cousins; William's grandfather David Alcott (1740–1841) was the brother of Amos Bronson Alcott's grandfather, Captain John Alcott. The two boys shared books, exchanged ideas, and started a small library together. Odell Shepard had written of Amos Bronson Alcott, "Indeed there is a sense in which nearly everything Alcott wrote and did is attributable to William".

Alcott lived in Dedham, Massachusetts, where he was the superintendent of the Sunday School at the Allin Congregational Church. He was known to walk barefoot on summer mornings from his home in the village up to Federal Hill to obtain a bucket of milk.

== Teaching and medical education ==
At the age of 18 Alcott began teaching in a school located just a few yards from his father's house. With brief interruptions, he would continue to teach for the next nine years. His experiences as a student country school teacher would later become the subject of many of his later publications. He observed that the benches used by students were often painful and, at his own expense built backs onto the benches; these became the ancestors of the later school desks. He campaigned for better heating and ventilation in schools. He labored to improve the intellectual content of classrooms. While he was successful as a teacher, in the summer of 1824 he suffered an attack of the disfiguring, dangerous skin infection erysipelas, and about this time was beginning to suffer from tuberculosis. He would suffer symptoms of both for the remainder of his life. He began studying medicine, with the thought that the extra knowledge would aid his teaching. His formal study of medicine was brief. In the winter of 1825–26 he attended "a regular course of medical studies" in New Haven, Connecticut. In March 1826 he was granted a license to practice medicine. In addition to teaching, he practiced medicine at least until 1829.

== William Channing Woodbridge and early writing ==
In the spring of 1830 he met William Channing Woodbridge. Woodbridge had just returned from Europe and was in the process of revising his second geography. Alcott at first worked as an assistant to Woodbridge for which he was paid twelve dollars a month to check facts and improve maps. The two became close friends. In 1831, Woodbridge purchased the American Journal of Education and renamed it American Annals of Education And Instruction. The two men then moved to Boston. Alcott wrote many articles for the journal, especially those dealing with school design and physical education. Even after Woodbridge lost control of the Journal in 1836 and became its foreign editor, Alcott became its Editor in 1837. He would later publish a poignant memoir of Woodbridge's life. While still teaching he had begun to contribute articles to newspapers and started work on the book that would become The Young Man's Guide.

== Later life ==
On June 14, 1836, he married Phebe Lewis Bronson (June 14, 1812 – November 9, 1907). They had three children. For a time they shared a house, Cottage Place, with the family of his old friend and cousin Amos Bronson Alcott. In the 1840s William moved to the town of Newton, Massachusetts, just outside Boston. Eventually he would settle into a house in Auburndale in the town of Newton. He died here of a lung infection. He worked until the day before he died. William Alcott is buried in Newton Cemetery.

== "Vegetable Diet" ==
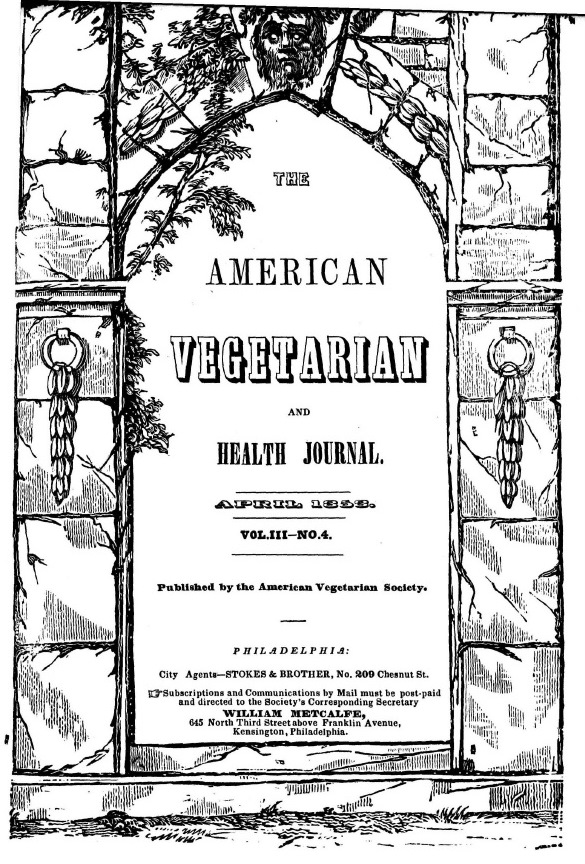
The American Vegetarian and Health Journal - Published by The American Vegetarian Society (AVS) - 1853

Alcott published Vegetable Diet: As Sanctioned by Medical Men and By Experience in All Ages in 1838. It is his best known work and is significant to the medical literature about a vegetarian diet. A second edition was published in 1849 "with an added cookbook and medical testimonies supporting what today would be called a vegan diet."

In his book, Eating History: Thirty Turning Points in the Making of American Cuisine, Andrew F. Smith attributed Alcott's Vegetable Diet as being "America's first vegetarian cookbook." In 2020, journalist Avery Yale Kamila wrote: "The book is considered a seminal work in the cannon of American vegetarian literature." The book contains letters written by physicians, including Horace A. Barrows, about vegetarian diets. The book is still in print.

The book is included in the American Antiquarian Cookbook Collection. In 2012, the book was republished by Andrews McMeel publishing with an introduction by Anna Thomas.

== Ideas, diet and morals ==
Alcott became one of the most prolific authors in early American history. He wrote frequently on the topics of education and health. In 1836, he wrote a letter defending Grahamism to the editor of the Boston Medical and Surgical Journal, published on May 4, 1836. Alcott titled the letter “The Graham System” and signed the article with the name “M.D.” In 1850, Alcott wrote three letters on vegetarianism for the New York Daily Tribune (one published on April 14 and the other two on November 6).

Alcott opposed the consumption of alcohol, coffee, meat, spices, and tea. He argued against the use of condiments, which were "stimulating" substances. He rejected the use of ginger, fennel, cardamom, mace, nutmeg, and coriander. He believed that garlic, horseradish, molasses, and sauces were disgusting and indecent "drugs".

Alcott wrote The Physiology of Marriage in 1856. He deplored free courtship manners. He specifically deplored "conversation which is too excitable", "presence of exciting books", "unnecessary heat", and many other courtship practices prevalent in 18th century America but steadily going out of fashion by 1856. He warned young people of the dangers of courtship. He is criticized by modern-day feminists for his "rigidity".

In Boston, Alcott edited the Moral Reformer (1835–1839), a journal dedicated to eliminating intemperance, gluttony, and licentiousness. He was the editor of the vegetarian Library of Health journal. In 1840, the Moral Reformer and The Graham Journal of Health and Longevity were merged in the Library of Health.

Alcott and Sylvester Graham founded the American Physiological Society (ASP) in 1837, with the purpose of “integrating a Grahamite lifestyle into a larger physiologically focused ideology.” The ASP sought to make the study of health access to all citizens and promoted a vegetarian diet. On May 15, 1850, Alcott, Sylvester Graham, and William Metcalfe founded the American Vegetarian Society, with Alcott serving as the first president.

== Books ==
In all, he wrote about one hundred books, which were influential in reforming educational methods and improving people's physical and moral well-being.

- The Young Woman's Guide, 1833
- The Young Man's Guide, 1834
- The Moral Reformer, and Teacher on the Human Constitution, Vol. 1, 1835; Vol. 2, 1836. Edited by Alcott.
- The Use of Tobacco: Its Physical, Intellectual, and Moral Effects on The Human System, 1836
- The House I Live In; or The Human Body, 1837
- Vegetable Diet: As Sanctioned by Medical Men, and by Experience in All Ages, 1838
- Tea And Coffee, 1839
- Confessions of a School Master, 1839
- The Young Housekeeper, 1842
- The Boy’s Guide to Usefulness, 1845
- Art of Good Behavior, 1848
- The Young Mother: or, Management of Children in Regard to Health
- The Young Mother
- Adventures of Lot, the Nephew of Abraham
- Familiar letters to young men on various subjects.: Designed as a companion to The young man's guide, 1850
- Trust in the Lord; or the Story of Elijah and the Ravens.
- Stories of Eliot and the Indians
- Lectures on Life and Health, Or, The Laws and Means of Physical Culture, 1853
- The Physiology of Marriage, 1856
- Forty Years in the Wilderness of Pills and Powders, 1859
- The Laws of Health: Or, Sequel to "The House I Live In", 1859

== See also ==
- List of vegetarians
