= Intrinsic value in animal ethics =

Value automatically conferred upon animals

The intrinsic value of a human or any other sentient animal comes from within itself. It is the value it places on its own existence. Intrinsic value exists wherever there are beings that value themselves.

Intrinsic value is considered self-ascribed, all animals have it, unlike instrumental or extrinsic values. Instrumental value is the value that others confer on an animal (or on any other entity) because of its value as a resource (e.g. as property, labour, food, fibre, "ecosystem services") or as a source of emotional, recreational, aesthetic or spiritual gratification. Intrinsic values are conferred from within an animal, and are therefore not directly measurable by economists, while extrinsic values are conferred from outside and can, in principle, be measured econometrically.

The phrase "intrinsic value" (often used synonymously with inherent value) has been adopted by animal rights advocates. The Dutch Animal Health and Welfare Act referred to intrinsic value in 1981: "Acknowledgment of the intrinsic value of animals means that animals have value in their own right and as a consequence, their interests are no longer automatically subordinate to man's interests." This acknowledgement has stirred a debate on what it entails in the context of animal husbandry, animal breeding, vivisection, animal testing, and biotechnology. It is also used by environmental advocates and in law to holistically encompass the totality of intrinsic values in an ecosystem. Article 7(d) of New Zealand's Resource Management Act (RMA), for example, requires particular regard to being given to the "intrinsic values of ecosystems".

== History of the moral status of animals (1880–1980) ==
Moral attitudes towards animals in the West (as expressed in public debate and legislation) have changed considerably over time. Britain's first anti-cruelty laws were introduced in the Cruelty to Animals Act 1835. After this development, many other countries followed suit with similar laws, especially in the second half of the 20th century. These laws did not challenge the idea that other animals are resources for human use and they only limited those acts of cruelty which (a) had few economic or social repercussions, and (b) were offensive to human sensibilities (the so-called Offence principle) or at odds with human dignity. These regulations were characterized as anthropocentric: they generally prioritized human economic and recreational interests, such as farming, fishing and blood sports, over animal suffering—that is, they favoured the animals' instrumental values over their intrinsic ones.

During the second half of the 20th century, the intensification of cattle breeding, the growth of pig and chicken factory farming, and the increased use of animals in harmful laboratory experiments provoked fierce debates in which the negative consequences for the animals themselves became an issue. Notably during the 1960s and 1970s, pressure groups started to argue on behalf of the interests of animals kept in laboratories and farms. They expressed their discontent with laws that protected the institutional cruelty of the animal exploitation industries while only prohibiting selected acts of individual cruelty in certain situations. They called for new forms of legislation that would protect animals for non-anthropocentric reasons.

In these discussions (of the moral relevance of the animal's welfare) two key issues were involved. Firstly, the Harm principle, rather than the Offence principle, should be the moral foundation for the protection of animals. Secondly, as to the scepticism expressed by scientists regarding the presence of consciousness and self-awareness in animals, they should be granted the benefit of the doubt by adopting the so-called analogy postulate. Applied ethological research into the behaviour of animals in captivity made it clear that the intensive use of animals had negative effects on the animal's health and well-being. Nevertheless, concern for the well-being of animals had to be purged from anthropomorphism and sentimentalism. This point of view is taken for example in a report by the Dutch Federation of Veterinarians in the EEC (FVE, 1978) concerning welfare problems among domestic animals. This document states that:

Although the interests of animals often conflict with the demands of society, society remains responsible for the welfare of the animals involved. Considerations regarding animal welfare ought to be based on veterinary, scientific and ethological norms, but not on sentiment. And although animals do not have fundamental rights, human beings have certain moral obligations towards them.

== Intrinsic value and animal ethics (1980–2000) ==
During the 1970s and 1980s, the criticism regarding the living conditions of farm and laboratory animals was reexamined in other social debates, notably the discussions concerning the protection of the (natural) environment and the ones concerning the development of new breeding techniques. Due to this broadening of the issues, other objections against the use of animals for scientific or economic reasons emerged. The instrumental use of the animals, it was said, is hard to reconcile with their intrinsic (or inherent) value. In 1981 the Dutch government included the intrinsic value-argument in a statement concerning the protection of animals (CRM, 1981). At that time, a principle was formulated that allowed for the possibility that, in some cases, the interests of animals might prevail over and above those of science and industry. The interests of the animal involved health and well-being as experienced by the animals themselves, independent from considerations concerning their suitability for human use. It was now claimed that animals have an intrinsic value, that is a good-of-their-own, and an interest in their own well-being.

Developments within the field of biotechnology broadened the scope of the debate on the moral status of animals even more. After the controversy concerning the transgenic bull Herman and the lactoferrin project of GenePharming, modern biotechnology has almost become synonymous with genetic engineering. In the debate on bull Herman, concern for the intrinsic value of animals became an issue in its own right. Many felt that there was more to intrinsic value than merely the concern for the animal's welfare. Since then, intrinsic value not only refers to the animal's welfare, but also to the moral attitude society takes towards animals (or nature). For some, this stance means a return to the Offence principle, and, therefore, not helpful in the struggle against anthropocentrism or anthropomorphism. Others, however, maintain that recognition of the intrinsic value of animals goes beyond animal welfare, since it respects the animal as "centre of its own being".

== Analysis of the term intrinsic value ==
One point of contention in the discussion around intrinsic value in relation to the moral status of animals, is the diversity of meanings and connotations associated with intrinsic value. Broadly speaking there are four main positions in this debate defining intrinsic value. One can adhere to a meaning of intrinsic value of animals in a sense that is:

- behaviouristic, as a morally neutral value that the animal's own (hence intrinsic) species-specific behaviour seeks to satisfy. Ethologists like Nikolaas Tinbergen and Gerard Baerends refer in this context to expectancy-values (see also ethology)
- utilitarian, as a formal basis to grant animals specific rights, based upon the idea of sentience and interests, defined by ethological knowledge, and defines corresponding human obligations (see also Peter Singer's ideas about Equal consideration of interests)
- deontological, as respect for the animal's telos or striving and consequential fundamental rights (see also Tom Regan's ideas about inherent value and animal rights)
- attitudinal, as prima facie respect for all living beings, regardless of qualities like sentience (see also Reverence for Life and Ethical intuitionism and Moral sense theory)

Of the first, behaviouristic interpretation, one can say (since it is morally neutral) that it is useless to ethical theory. Of the fourth, attitudinal or intuitionistic interpretation, one can say that it is indiscriminate of sentience or interests, and could be used for any kind of (natural, cultural or abstract) entity worth protecting (including species, cultures, languages, historical buildings or sites, etc.). The core issue in the debate over intrinsic value of animals remains between utilitarianists and deontologists.

== See also ==
- Animal cognition
- Animal consciousness
- Animal ethics
- Animal law
- Cambridge Declaration on Consciousness
- Deep ecology
- Ethics of uncertain sentience
- Instrumental and intrinsic value
- Moral status of animals in the ancient world
- Relative deprivation
- Sentientism
- Veganism
- Vegetarianism
- Vivisection
