= William Metcalfe =

English-American minister, physician, and activist (1788–1862)

The Reverend William Metcalfe
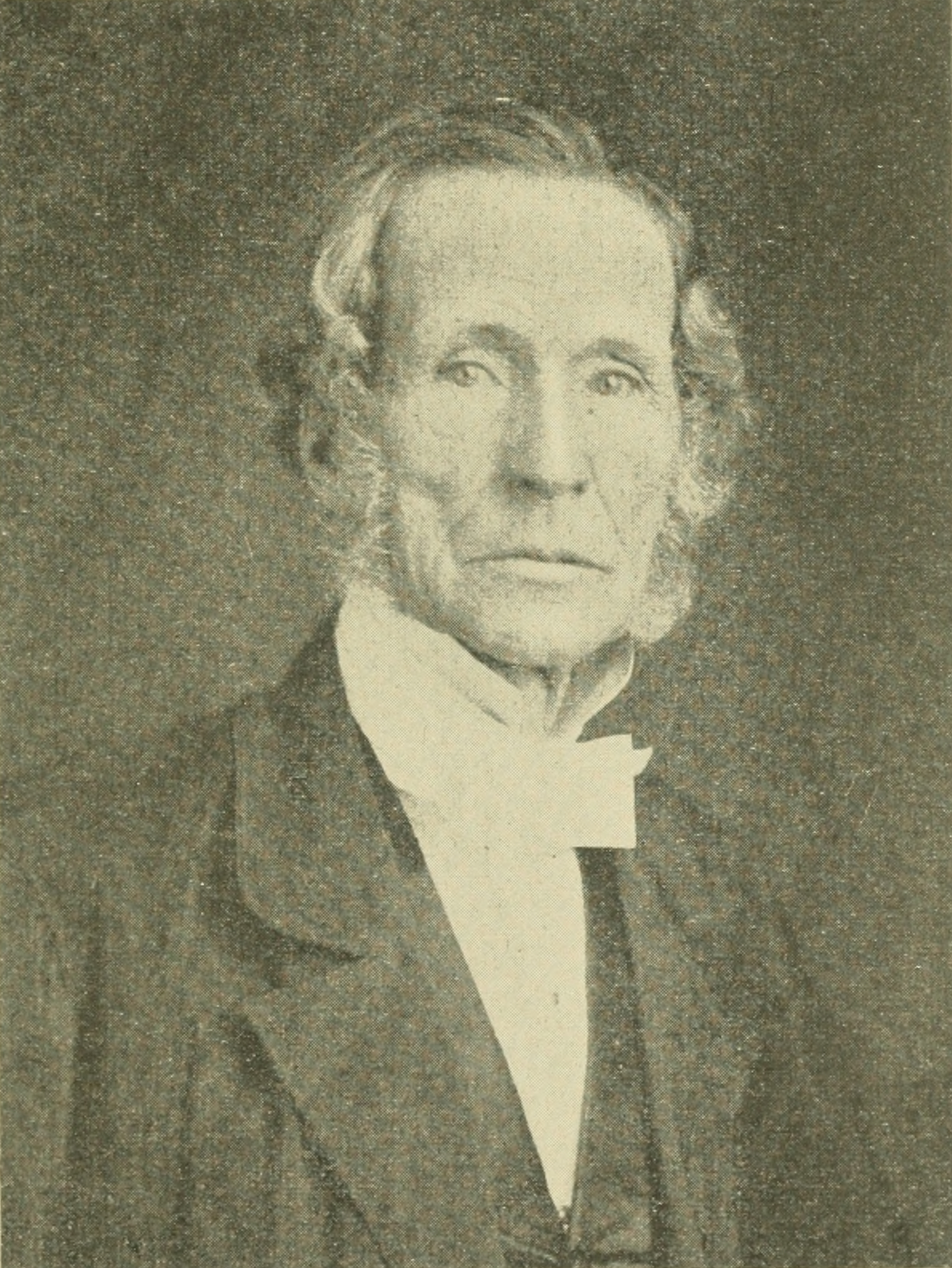
- Metcalfe in History of the Philadelphia Bible-Christian Church (1922)
- Born: March 11, 1788; Orton, Westmoreland, England
- Died: October 16, 1862 (aged 74); Philadelphia, Pennsylvania, U.S.
- Occupations: Minister; physician; activist
- Years active: 1811–1862
- Organizations: Bible Christian Church; American Vegetarian Society
- Spouse: Susanna Wright (m. 1810; died 1854)
- Children: 1

William Metcalfe (March 11, 1788 – October 16, 1862) was an English-American Bible Christian minister, homeopathic physician, and advocate of vegetarianism, pacifism, temperance, and abolitionism. Ordained by William Cowherd in 1811, he emigrated to the United States with other Bible Christians in 1817 and founded the Philadelphia Bible Christian Church. In 1850, he helped establish the American Vegetarian Society with figures including William Alcott, Sylvester Graham, and Russell Thacher Trall. After Alcott's death in 1859, Metcalfe served as the society's president. He also edited and published reform periodicals.

== Biography ==
=== Early life ===
William Metcalfe was born in Orton, Westmoreland, on March 11, 1788, the son of Jonathan and Elizabeth Metcalfe. At the age of 19, he became a clerk in Keighley, Yorkshire. There he encountered a congregation of Swedenborgians led by Rev. Joseph Wright, with whom he became associated. Wright encouraged Metcalfe to study theology, and Metcalfe later attended an academy in Salford led by William Cowherd, founder of the Bible Christian Church. Cowherd ordained Metcalfe as a minister in 1811. In 1810, Metcalfe married Susanna Wright, daughter of Rev. Joseph Wright. She was also a vegetarian and abstainer. Their son, Joseph, was born in the same year.

=== Philadelphia Bible Christian Church ===
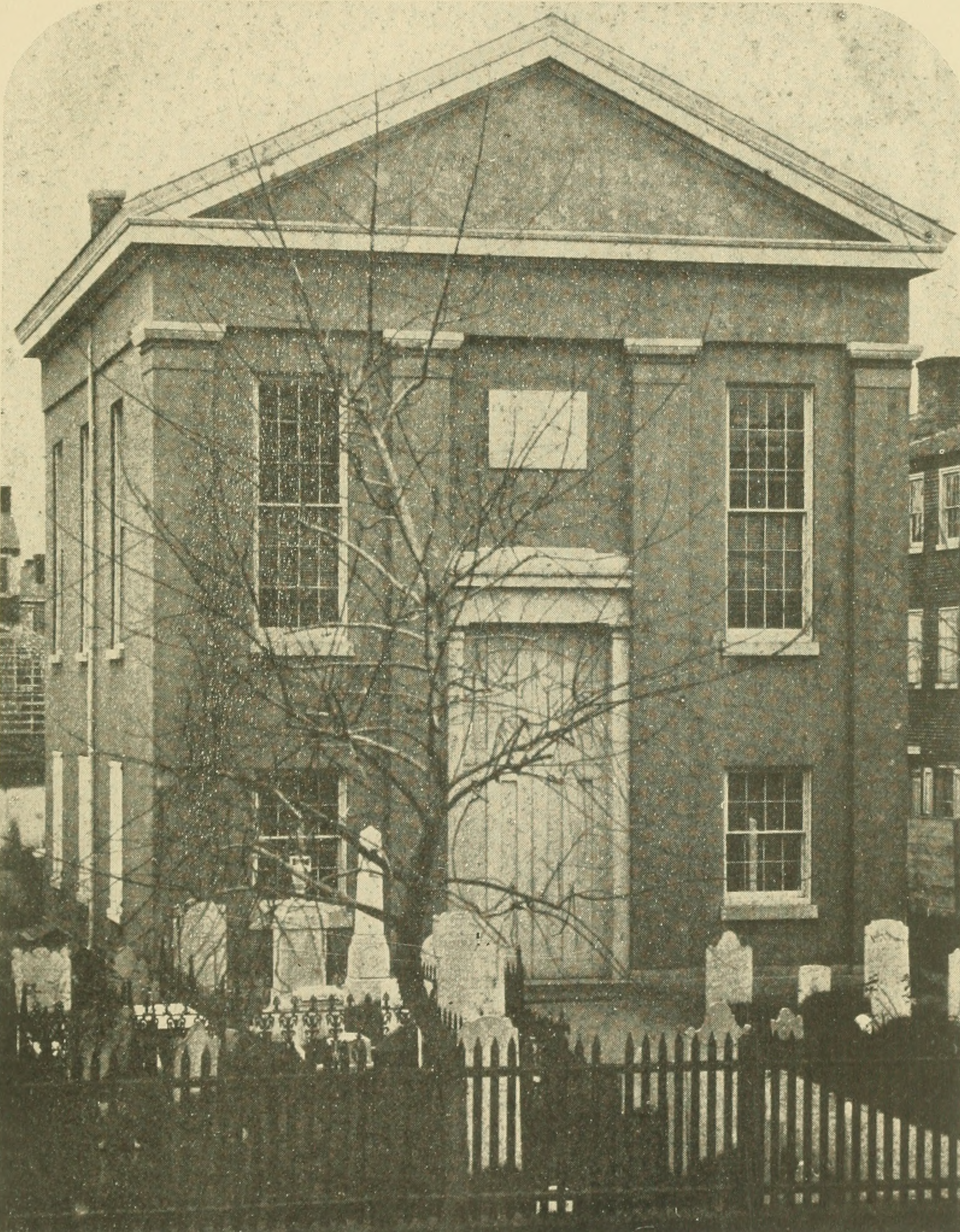
Chapel of the Philadelphia Bible Christian Church, built in 1845 on the site of the original wooden chapel

In 1817, Metcalfe and the Reverend James Clark (Note: Not to be confused with James Clark (1830–1905). Clark's surname was also spelled Clarke.) emigrated to the United States with around 40 members of the Bible Christian Church. (Note: The group included Metcalfe's wife and his son.) The migration was undertaken under Cowherd's direction. They formed the Philadelphia Bible Christian Church, which has been described as the first vegetarian church in the United States. Some members of the group maintained their vegetarian practices and later contributed to the American vegetarian movement.

Metcalfe and his wife taught pacifism, temperance, abolitionism, and vegetarianism, all of which were principles associated with their faith. The congregation remained small. Metcalfe taught that Jesus was vegetarian, a view that drew criticism and was questioned in newspapers.

Metcalfe also worked to support the church financially. In addition to preaching, he taught in the church's school and wrote and published two newspapers that addressed slavery, temperance, and other reform topics. He also treated patients using homeopathy.

=== Vegetarianism ===
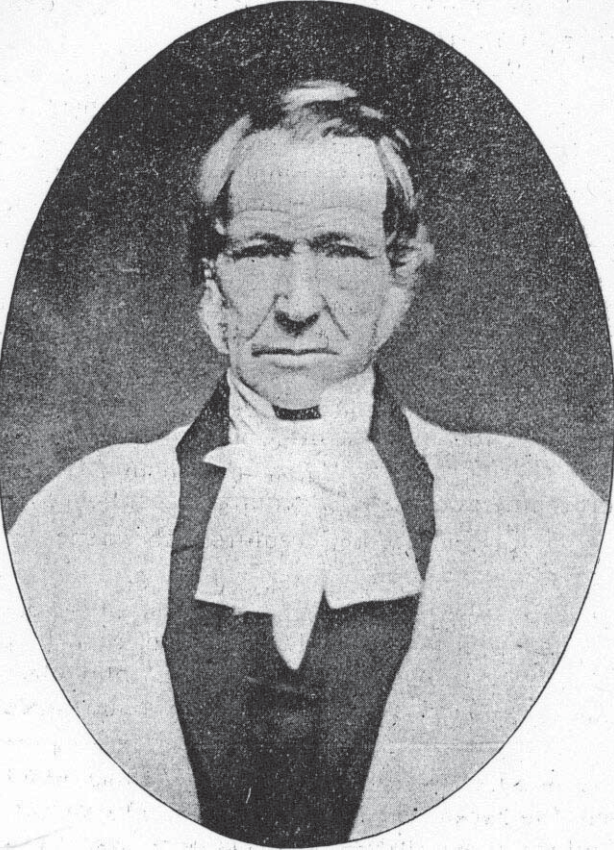
Metcalfe in clerical attire

Vance Lehmkuhl describes Metcalfe as the first public advocate of vegetarianism to gain recognition across the Northeastern United States. Metcalfe later became associated with the vegetarian advocate William Alcott. He also invited speakers to Philadelphia, including Sylvester Graham.

In 1850, Metcalfe, Graham, Alcott, and Russell Trall established the American Vegetarian Society in New York City. The society was influenced by the British Vegetarian Society, which had been founded in 1847. Metcalfe served as foreign corresponding secretary of the British society.

=== Later life and death ===
Metcalfe's wife died in 1854. In 1859, after the death of American Vegetarian Society president William Alcott, Metcalfe was elected as his successor. Metcalfe died on October 16, 1862, aged 74, from a pulmonary hemorrhage. In 1872, his son published his father's discourses as Out of the Clouds into the Light.

== Publications ==
- Bible Testimony, on Abstinence from the Flesh of Animals as Food: Being an Address Delivered in the Bible-Christian Church (1840)
- Memoir of the Rev. William Metcalfe, M.D. Late Minister of the Bible-Christian Church, Philadelphia (1866)
- Out of the Clouds: Into the Light (1872)

== See also ==
- Christian vegetarianism
- History of vegetarianism
- Vegetarianism in the Victorian era
- Vegetarianism in the United Kingdom
- Vegetarianism in the United States
- Temperance movement in the United Kingdom
- Temperance movement in the United States
