= Pain in animals =

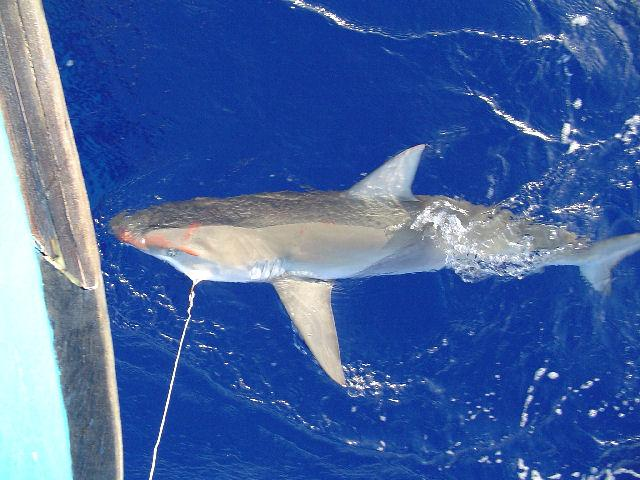
A Galapagos shark hooked by a fishing boat

Pain is experienced by a wide range of animals. Physical pain generally involves nociceptors sensing harmful stimuli (such as excessive heat), and transmitting that information to the brain. Most animals have nociception, but it is difficult to determine whether the brain processes those signals in a way that causes a subjective feeling of pain or just unconscious reflexes.

Scientists cannot directly measure pain. To estimate how likely it is that an animal can feel pain, they look for the presence of nociception and a complex nervous system, behavioural evidence such as grooming, or whether analgesics have effects.

According to the U.S. National Research Council Committee on Recognition and Alleviation of Pain in Laboratory Animals, pain is experienced by many animal species, including mammals and possibly all vertebrates. There is behavioral evidence that some invertebrates like octopuses and crabs can feel pain, but for some others like insects the evidence is weaker.

== Pain perception in animals ==
Pain is defined by the International Association for the Study of Pain as "an unpleasant sensory and emotional experience associated with actual or potential tissue damage, or described in terms of such damage." However, it is hard, if even possible, for an observer to measure whether an emotional experience has occurred, especially if the animal cannot communicate. Therefore, this concept is often excluded in definitions of pain in animals, such as that provided by Zimmerman: "an aversive sensory experience caused by actual or potential injury that elicits protective motor and vegetative reactions, results in learned avoidance and may modify species-specific behaviour, including social behaviour." Nonhuman animals cannot report their feelings to humans through language, but observation of their behaviour provides some evidence as to the extent of their pain.

Although there are numerous definitions of pain, almost all involve two key components. First, nociception is required. This is the ability to detect noxious stimuli which evoke a reflex response that rapidly moves the entire animal, or the affected part of its body, away from the source of the stimulus. The concept of nociception does not imply any adverse, subjective "feeling" – it is a reflex action. An example in humans would be the rapid withdrawal of a finger that has touched something hot – the withdrawal occurs before any sensation of pain is actually experienced.

The second component is the experience of "pain" itself, or suffering – the internal, emotional interpretation of the nociceptive experience. Again in humans, this is when the withdrawn finger begins to hurt, moments after the withdrawal. Pain is therefore a private, emotional experience. Pain cannot be directly measured in other animals, including other humans; responses to putatively painful stimuli can be measured, but not the experience itself. To address this problem when assessing the capacity of other species to experience pain, argument-by-analogy is used. This is based on the principle that if an animal responds to a stimulus in a similar way to ourselves, it is likely to have had an analogous experience.

The ability to experience pain in an animal, or another human for that matter, cannot be determined directly but it may be inferred through analogous physiological and behavioral reactions. Although many animals share similar mechanisms of pain detection to those of humans, have similar areas of the brain involved in processing pain, and show similar pain behaviours, it is notoriously difficult to assess how animals actually experience pain.

=== Nociception ===
Nociceptive nerves, which preferentially detect (potential) injury-causing stimuli, have been identified in a variety of animals, including invertebrates. The medicinal leech, Hirudo medicinalis, and sea slug are classic model systems for studying nociception. Many other vertebrate and invertebrate animals also show nociceptive reflex responses similar to our own.

=== Reflex response to painful stimuli ===
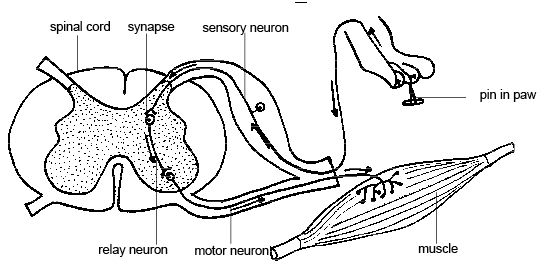
Reflex arc of a dog when its paw is stuck with a pin. The spinal cord responds to signals from receptors in the paw, producing a reflex withdrawal of the paw. This localized response does not involve brain processes that might mediate a consciousness of pain, though these might also occur.

Nociception usually involves the transmission of a signal along nerve fibers from the site of a noxious stimulus at the periphery to the spinal cord. Although this signal is also transmitted on to the brain, a reflex response, such as flinching or withdrawal of a limb, is produced by return signals originating in the spinal cord. Thus, both physiological and behavioral responses to nociception can be detected, and no reference need be made to a conscious experience of pain. Based on such criteria, nociception has been observed in all major animal taxa.

=== Awareness of pain ===
Nerve impulses from nociceptors may reach the brain, where information about the stimulus (e.g. quality, location, and intensity), and effect (unpleasantness) are registered. Though the brain activity involved has been studied, the brain processes underlying conscious awareness are not well known.

=== Behavioral and physiological indicators ===
Many animals also exhibit more complex behavioural and physiological changes indicative of the ability to experience pain: they eat less food, their normal behaviour is disrupted, their social behaviour is suppressed, they may adopt unusual behaviour patterns, they may emit characteristic distress calls, experience respiratory and cardiovascular changes, as well as inflammation and release of stress hormones.

Some criteria that may indicate the potential of another species to feel pain include:

1. Has a suitable nervous system and sensory receptors
2. Physiological changes to noxious stimuli
3. Displays protective motor reactions that might include reduced use of an affected area such as limping, rubbing, holding or autotomy
4. Has opioid receptors and shows reduced responses to noxious stimuli when given analgesics and local anaesthetics
5. Shows trade-offs between stimulus avoidance and other motivational requirements
6. Shows avoidance learning
7. High cognitive ability and sentience

== Adaptive value ==
The adaptive value of nociception is obvious; an organism detecting a noxious stimulus immediately withdraws the limb, appendage or entire body from the noxious stimulus and thereby avoids further (potential) injury. However, a characteristic of pain (in mammals at least) is that pain can result in hyperalgesia (a heightened sensitivity to noxious stimuli) and allodynia (a heightened sensitivity to non-noxious stimuli). When this heightened sensitisation occurs, the adaptive value is less clear. First, the pain arising from the heightened sensitisation can be disproportionate to the actual tissue damage caused. Second, the heightened sensitisation may also become chronic, persisting well beyond the tissues healing. This can mean that rather than the actual tissue damage causing pain, it is the pain due to the heightened sensitisation that becomes the concern. This means the sensitisation process is sometimes termed maladaptive. It is often suggested hyperalgesia and allodynia assist organisms to protect themselves during healing, but experimental evidence to support this has been lacking.

In 2014, the adaptive value of sensitisation due to injury was tested using the predatory interactions between longfin inshore squid (Doryteuthis pealeii) and black sea bass (Centropristis striata) which are natural predators of this squid. If injured squid are targeted by a bass, they began their defensive behaviours sooner (indicated by greater alert distances and longer flight initiation distances) than uninjured squid. If anaesthetic (1% ethanol and MgCl_{2}) is administered prior to the injury, this prevents the sensitisation and blocks the behavioural effect. The authors claim this study is the first experimental evidence to support the argument that nociceptive sensitisation is actually an adaptive response to injuries.

== Argument-by-analogy ==
To assess the capacity of other species to consciously suffer pain we resort to argument-by-analogy. That is, if an animal responds to a stimulus the way a human does, it is likely to have had an analogous experience. If we stick a pin in a chimpanzee's finger and she rapidly withdraws her hand, we use argument-by-analogy and infer that like us, she felt pain. It might be argued that consistency requires us to infer, also, that a cockroach experiences conscious pain when it writhes after being stuck with a pin. The usual counter-argument is that although the physiology of consciousness is not understood, it clearly involves complex brain processes not present in relatively simple organisms. Other analogies have been pointed out. For example, when given a choice of foods, rats and chickens with clinical symptoms of pain will consume more of an analgesic-containing food than animals not in pain. Additionally, the consumption of the analgesic carprofen in lame chickens was positively correlated to the severity of lameness, and consumption resulted in an improved gait. Such anthropomorphic arguments face the criticism that physical reactions indicating pain may be neither the cause nor result of conscious states, and the approach is subject to criticism of anthropomorphic interpretation. For example, a single-celled organism such as an amoeba may writhe after being exposed to noxious stimuli despite the absence of nociception.

== History ==
The idea that animals might not experience pain or suffering as humans do traces back at least to the 17th-century French philosopher, René Descartes, who argued that animals lack consciousness. Researchers remained unsure into the 1980s as to whether animals experience pain, and veterinarians trained in the U.S. before 1989 were simply taught to ignore animal pain. In his interactions with scientists and other veterinarians, Bernard Rollin was regularly asked to "prove" that animals are conscious, and to provide "scientifically acceptable" grounds for claiming that they feel pain. Some authors say that the view that animals feel pain differently is now a minority view. Academic reviews of the topic are more equivocal, noting that, although it is likely that some animals have at least simple conscious thoughts and feelings, some authors continue to question how reliably animal mental states can be determined.

== In different species ==
=== Fish ===
A typical human cutaneous nerve contains 83% C type trauma receptors (the type responsible for transmitting signals described by humans as excruciating pain); the same nerves in humans with congenital insensitivity to pain have only 24-28% C type receptors. The rainbow trout has about 5% C type fibres, while sharks and rays have 0%. Nevertheless, fish have been shown to have sensory neurons that are sensitive to damaging stimuli and are physiologically identical to human nociceptors. Behavioural and physiological responses to a painful event appear comparable to those seen in amphibians, birds, and mammals, and administration of an analgesic drug reduces these responses in fish.

Animal welfare advocates have raised concerns about the possible suffering of fish caused by angling. Some countries, e.g. Germany, have banned specific types of fishing, and the British RSPCA now formally prosecutes individuals who are cruel to fish.

=== Invertebrates ===
Though it has been argued that most invertebrates do not feel pain, there is some evidence that invertebrates, especially the decapod crustaceans (e.g. crabs and lobsters) and cephalopods (e.g. octopuses), exhibit behavioural and physiological reactions indicating they may have the capacity for this experience. Nociceptors have been found in nematodes, annelids and mollusks. Insects also usually possess nociceptors. In vertebrates, endogenous opioids are neurochemicals that moderate pain by interacting with opiate receptors. Opioid peptides and opiate receptors occur naturally in nematodes, mollusks, insects and crustaceans. The presence of opioids in crustaceans has been interpreted as an indication that lobsters may be able to experience pain, although it has been claimed "at present no certain conclusion can be drawn".

One suggested reason for rejecting a pain experience in invertebrates is that invertebrate brains are too small. However, brain size does not necessarily equate to complexity of function. Moreover, weight for body-weight, the cephalopod brain is in the same size bracket as the vertebrate brain, smaller than that of birds and mammals, but as big as or bigger than most fish brains. Remarkably, as demonstrated by cognitive tests, intelligence of cephalopods is comparable to that of five-year-old human children.

Since September 2010, all cephalopods being used for scientific purposes in the EU are protected by EU Directive 2010/63/EU which states "...there is scientific evidence of their [cephalopods] ability to experience pain, suffering, distress and lasting harm. In the UK, animal protection legislation means that cephalopods used for scientific purposes must be killed humanely, according to prescribed methods (known as "Schedule 1 methods of euthanasia") known to minimise suffering.

== In animal farming ==
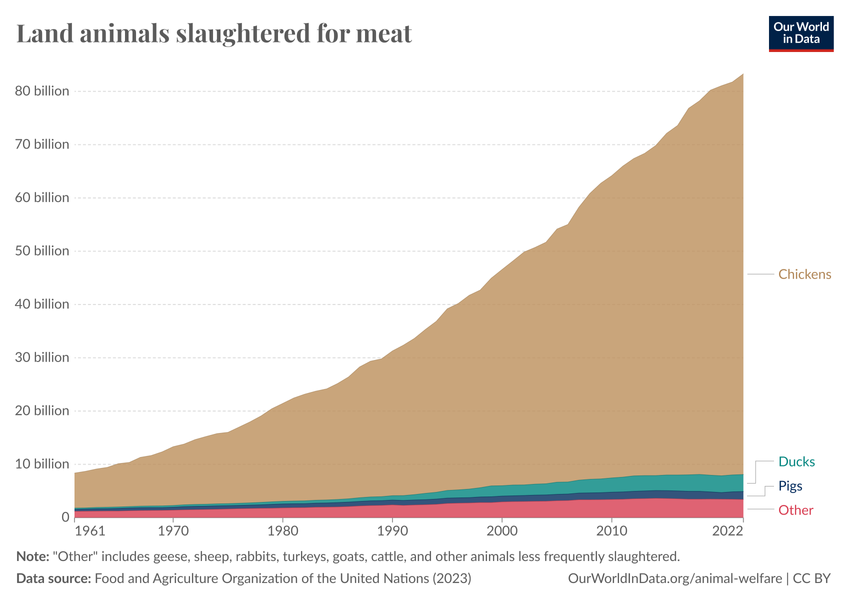
Over 80 billions of land animals are slaughtered for meat every year.

In 2023, it is estimated that 74% of all land livestock are factory farmed. In the United States, 99% of all livestock was estimated in 2017 to be factory farmed. Factory farming, or intensive animal farming, is characterized by densely confined animals and comes with a range of issues, including:

- Confinement methods – Many animals, such as egg-laying hens, are kept in cages with limited space to move. Similarly, pregnant pigs are often kept in gestation crates, which are so small that the animals cannot turn around.
- Aggressiveness – In densely confined environments without intellectual stimulation, animals tend to become aggressive, sometimes also engaging in cannibalism.
- Mutilations – These procedures are often intended to reduce aggression in these environments and are typically performed without anesthetic. Examples include trimming the beaks of chickens, and clipping the teeth and tails of piglets. Piglets are also frequently castrated to avoid a bad smell that can sometimes develop in the meat. Routine tail clipping is considered a traumatic practice for pigs and is banned in Europe, but the ban is often ignored in practice.
- Genetic selection – Farmed animals are typically genetically selected to increase productivity. For instance, chickens often struggle to stand due to their unnatural weight, which can also lead to heart and lung problems.
- Diseases – The lack of genetic diversity and the density of animals in confinement can lead to the spread of diseases, some of which can also be transmitted to humans.
- Artificial insemination – Animals are frequently impregnated through artificial insemination, a process carried out by humans.
- Early separations from mothers
- Stress

Despite their vast numbers, factory farmed animals are relatively ignored. Species that appear more different from humans, such as fish or insects, are often particularly overlooked. One proposed solution to reduce farmed animal suffering is to develop plant-based and cultured alternatives to animal products.

== In the wild ==
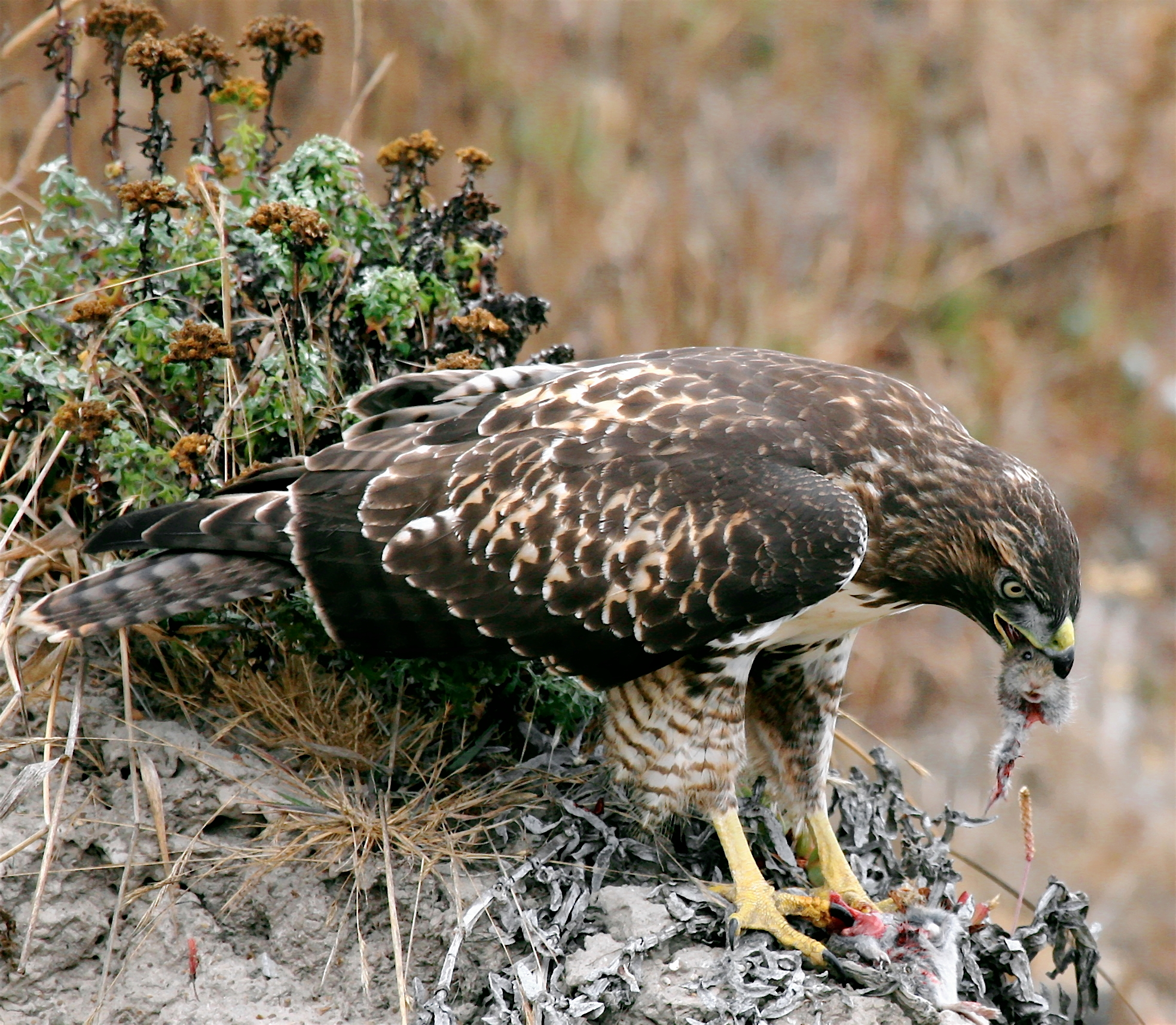
Juvenile red-tailed hawk eating a California vole

Wild animal suffering is the suffering experienced by wild animals as a result of natural processes such as disease, injury, parasitism, starvation, dehydration, weather, natural disasters, predation, and psychological stress. The topic concerns the extent of these harms, their moral status, and whether humans should respond to them.

== In medicine and research ==
=== Veterinary medicine ===
Veterinary medicine uses, for actual or potential animal pain, the same analgesics and anesthetics as used in humans.

=== Dolorimetry ===
Dolorimetry (dolor: Latin: pain, grief) is the measurement of the pain response in animals, including humans. It is practiced occasionally in medicine, as a diagnostic tool, and is regularly used in research into the basic science of pain, and in testing the efficacy of analgesics.

The intense sociality of humans and the readiness with which they perceive, and identify with, manifestations of physical pain in others have made the study of pain notoriously difficult to quantify. Indeed, many investigators of animal pain shy away from use of the word "pain" in published research. They consider the term to be unscientific and grounded in human emotion, preferring others such as "stress" or "avoidance". As the subjective experience of animals is very resistant to rational assessment, the subjective difference between their painless reflex responses to noxious stimuli (nociception) and pain as humans understand it has been nearly impossible to determine conclusively.

For this reason essentially all scientific research into the nature of animal pain has depended upon so-called pain proxies. These include obvious behavioral changes—shying away, stamping, vocalization, ear cues etc.— as well as subtler changes, as when injured chickens or rats choose feed that has been laced with an analgesic over feed that has not. Most prized by scientists are the quantifiable physiological changes such as elevated heart rate or stress hormone serum concentrations. These physiological proxies are valued because their assessments are carried out by machines and do not rely on humans to determine the magnitude of the variable under study. This is seldom the case for behavioral pain proxies, which are most often scored by a researcher on some numerical scale ranging from "no response" to "intense response".

==== Dolormetric methods in animals ====
Nonhuman animal pain measurement techniques include the paw pressure test, tail flick test, hot plate test and grimace scales. Grimace scales are used to assess post-operative and disease pain in mammals. Scales have been developed for ten mammalian species such as mice, rats, and rabbits. Dale Langford established and published the Mouse Grimace Scale in 2010, with Susana Sotocinal inventing the Rat Grimace Scale a year later in 2011. Using video stills from recorders, researchers can track changes in an animal's positioning of ears and whiskers, orbital tightening, and bulging or flattening of the nose area, and match these images against the images in the grimace scale. Laboratory researcher and veterinarians may use the grimace scales to evaluate when to administer analgesia to an animal or whether severity of pain warrants a humane endpoint (euthanasia) for the animal in a study.

=== Laboratory animals ===
Animals are kept in laboratories for a wide range of reasons, some of which may involve pain, suffering or distress, whilst others (e.g. many of those involved in breeding) will not. The extent to which animal testing causes pain and suffering in laboratory animals is the subject of much debate. Marian Stamp Dawkins defines "suffering" in laboratory animals as the experience of one of "a wide range of extremely unpleasant subjective (mental) states." The U.S. National Research Council has published guidelines on the care and use of laboratory animals, as well as a report on recognizing and alleviating pain in vertebrates. The United States Department of Agriculture defines a "painful procedure" in an animal study as one that would "reasonably be expected to cause more than slight or momentary pain or distress in a human being to which that procedure was applied." Some critics argue that, paradoxically, researchers raised in the era of increased awareness of animal welfare may be inclined to deny that animals are in pain simply because they do not want to see themselves as people who inflict it. PETA however argues that there is no doubt about animals in laboratories being inflicted with pain. In the UK, animal research likely to cause "pain, suffering, distress or lasting harm" is regulated by the Animals (Scientific Procedures) Act 1986 and research with the potential to cause pain is regulated by the Animal Welfare Act of 1966 in the US.

In the U.S., researchers are not required to provide laboratory animals with pain relief if the administration of such drugs would interfere with their experiment. Laboratory animal veterinarian Larry Carbone writes, "Without question, present public policy allows humans to cause laboratory animals unalleviated pain. The AWA, the Guide for the Care and Use of Laboratory Animals, and current Public Health Service policy all allow for the conduct of what are often called 'Category E' studies – experiments in which animals are expected to undergo significant pain or distress that will be left untreated because treatments for pain would be expected to interfere with the experiment."

==== Severity scales ====
Eleven countries have national classification systems of pain and suffering experienced by animals used in research: Australia, Canada, Finland, Germany, The Republic of Ireland, The Netherlands, New Zealand, Poland, Sweden, Switzerland, and the UK. The US also has a mandated national scientific animal-use classification system, but it is markedly different from other countries in that it reports on whether pain-relieving drugs were required and/or used. The first severity scales were implemented in 1986 by Finland and the UK. The number of severity categories ranges between 3 (Sweden and Finland) and 9 (Australia). In the UK, research projects are classified as "mild", "moderate", and "substantial" in terms of the suffering the researchers conducting the study say they may cause; a fourth category of "unclassified" means the animal was anesthetized and killed without recovering consciousness. It should be remembered that in the UK system, many research projects (e.g. transgenic breeding, feeding distasteful food) will require a license under the Animals (Scientific Procedures) Act 1986, but may cause little or no pain or suffering. In December 2001, 39% (1,296) of project licenses in force were classified as "mild", 55% (1,811) as "moderate", 2% (63) as "substantial", and 4% (139) as "unclassified". In 2009, of the project licenses issued, 35% (187) were classified as "mild", 61% (330) as "moderate", 2% (13) as "severe" and 2% (11) as unclassified.

In the US, the Guide for the Care and Use of Laboratory Animals defines the parameters for animal testing regulations. It states, "The ability to experience and respond to pain is widespread in the animal kingdom...Pain is a stressor and, if not relieved, can lead to unacceptable levels of stress and distress in animals." The Guide states that the ability to recognize the symptoms of pain in different species is essential for the people caring for and using animals. Accordingly, all issues of animal pain and distress, and their potential treatment with analgesia and anesthesia, are required regulatory issues for animal protocol approval.

== See also ==
- Animal ethics
- Animal cognition
- Animal welfare
- Animal welfare science
- Bridge locus
- Animal consciousness
- Cruelty to animals
- Emotion in animals
- Ethics of uncertain sentience
- List of mutilatory procedures on animals
- Psychology of eating meat
- Moral status of animals in the ancient world
- Neural correlates of consciousness
- Philosophy of mind
- Three Rs (animal research)
