= Jeffrey Mogil =

Canadian neuroscientist (born 1966)

- Born: Jeffrey Steven Mogil; August 24, 1966 (age 60); Toronto, Ontario, Canada
- Education: University of Toronto, UCLA
- Known for: Pain research, transdisciplinary research, sex differences
- Awards: Fellow of the Canadian Academy of Health Sciences, Fellow of the Royal Society of Canada, Distinguished Career Award of the Canadian Pain Society, Bennet Cohen Award from the International Council for Laboratory Animal Science, SGV Award, Frederick W.L. Kerr Basic Science Research Award and Elizabeth Narcessian Award for Outstanding Educational Achievement from the American Pain Society
- Scientific career
- Fields: Neuroscience, neurogenetics
- Workplaces: University of Illinois at Urbana–Champaign, McGill University
- Doctoral advisor: John Liebeskind
- Website: MOGILab.ca

Jeffrey S. Mogil, FCAHS, FRSC (born August 24, 1966) is a Canadian neuroscientist and the E.P. Taylor Professor of Pain Studies and Distinguished James McGill Professor at McGill University. He is known for his work in the genetics of pain, for being among the first scientists to demonstrate sex differences in pain perception, and for identifying previously unknown factors and confounds that affect the integrity of contemporary pain research. He has an h-index of 100.

== Biography ==
Jeffrey Mogil was born in Toronto, Ontario, Canada. He obtained his B.Sc. (Hons.) from the University of Toronto, and his Ph.D. from the University of California, Los Angeles in 1993. Following a postdoctoral fellowship at Oregon Health Sciences University, he obtained a faculty position at the University of Illinois at Urbana-Champaign from 1996 to 2001 before moving to McGill University in 2001 as full professor.

== Positions ==
- Past Director of the Alan Edwards Centre for Research on Pain
- Founder and director of the North American Pain School (NAPS)

== Awards ==
- 2020: Fellow, Canadian Academy of Health Sciences
- 2020: Distinguished Career Award, Canadian Pain Society
- 2019: Fellow, Academy of the Social Sciences, Royal Society of Canada (Fellow, Academy of the Social Sciences)
- 2018: Donald O. Hebb Award for Distinguished Contributions to Psychology as a Science, Canadian Psychological Association
- 2015: #1 discovery of 2015 by Quebec Science magazine
- 2015: Bennet Cohen Award, International Council for Laboratory Animal Science
- 2014: Mayday Pain & Society Fellow, The Mayday Fund
- 2013: Frederick W.L. Kerr Basic Science Research Award (for lifetime achievement), American Pain Society
- 2012: SGV Award, Swiss Laboratory Animal Science Association
- 2004: Early Career Award, Canadian Pain Society
- 2002: Patrick D. Wall Young Investigator Award, International Association for the Study of Pain
- 2001: Canada Research Chair in the Genetics of Pain (Tier I), Canadian Institutes of Health Research
- 1998: John C. Liebeskind Early Career Scholar Award, American Pain Society
- 1998: Neal E. Miller New Investigator Award, Academy of Behavioral Medicine Research

== Scientific contributions ==
=== Sex differences in pain mechanisms ===
Mogil and colleagues have published many papers detailing how the physiological mechanisms underlying pain perception differ by sex in laboratory rodents and humans, and he was among the first to call for the inclusion of female rodents in biomedical research. He was the founding Co-Chair of the Special Interest Group in Sex, Gender and Pain at the International Association for the Study of Pain. His team showed in 2015 that male and female mice were employing wholly different immune cells—microglia and T cells, respectively—in the spinal cord to process chronic pain. This finding was immediately influential within the scientific community and widely covered in the media. It was voted the #1 discovery of 2015 by Quebec Science magazine, inspired an editorial in the New York Times, was chosen as one of 10 milestones in pain research from 2000 BC to the present by Nature, and was cited by funding agencies in Canada and the United States in support of new Sex as a Biological Variable policies.

Other notable sex difference findings from his group include a meta-analysis showing that women are more sensitive to pain than men; morphine analgesia, stress-induced analgesia, and opioid-induced hyperalgesia are mediated by different neurochemical receptors in the two sexes (NMDA receptors and V1AR receptors in males, and MC1Rs in females) in male and female mice and humans; male and female mice have equivalent variability in pain sensitivity; pain variability is due to different genes in both sexes; female mice are more sensitive to itch than male mice; pain reduces sexual desire in male but not female mice; sex differences in morphine analgesia may be mediated by T cells; pain affects dominance hierarchy in male but not female mice; and, male but not female mice and humans display classically conditioned pain hypersensitivity.

=== Development of rodent "Grimace scale" ===
For the past century, the measurement of pain in rodent biomedical research was considered complicated and imprecise, and many researchers suggested there is a mismatch between human clinical pain symptoms and established procedures in rodents. Based on the human Neonatal Facial Coding Scale, which is itself based on the Facial Action Coding System, Mogil and colleagues developed the Mouse Grimace Scale and the Rat Grimace Scale. The original findings were highly cited, widely covered in the scientific press, and Mogil was awarded the Bennet Cohen Award from the International Council for Laboratory Animal Science and the SGV Award from the Swiss Laboratory Animal Science Association for the finding. Grimace scales are now routinely used in institutional veterinary settings for the determination of post-operative pain in animals, and have been developed for 10 species: mice, rats, rabbits, cats, horses, cows, pigs, sheep, ferret, and seal.

Mogil's laboratory has made a number of other advances in algesiometry or dolorimetry (i.e., pain testing in animals) including the development of an animal model of vulvodynia.

=== Demonstration of empathy in mice ===
Although a handful of controversial papers from the 1950s and 1960s had suggested that non-primate mammals might be capable of altruism, Mogil's group was the first to provide modern evidence that mice were capable of emotional contagion of pain, a form of empathy. They showed that mice display more pain behavior if they are tested in close proximity to other mice also in pain, but only if the two mice are familiar with each other. This finding, which was also widely covered in the press, launched a renaissance of new research into the topic of rodent social abilities.

Mogil's lab subsequently showed that familiar (but not stranger) humans also demonstrate highly similar emotional contagion of pain, and that reduction of stress via metyrapone treatment or a shared social experience (playing the videogame Rock Band together) can elicit empathy in strangers. This study was covered in the popular press, including an episode of the TED Radio Hour.

=== Discovery of pain genes ===
Using both quantitative trait locus mapping and genetic association study (including GWAS) techniques, Mogil's laboratory has provided evidence for the involvement of over 25 genes with pain and analgesia. The most notable of these was the demonstration in 2003 that the MC1R gene, most well known for its mutations causing red hair, is associated with Κ-opioid analgesia in women but not men. This finding was featured in the popular press.

=== Discovery of factors affecting experiments ===
Mogil and colleagues revealed a number of previously unidentified factors affecting the conclusions drawn from biomedical experiments. In 1996, they demonstrated that the newly discovered orphan opioid peptide, orphanin FQ/nociception, did not produce hyperalgesia as originally reported, but rather was reversing the stress-induced analgesia resulting from the intracerebroventricular injection through which it was administered. In 1999, they showed that different inbred strains of mice displayed very different pain sensitivity.

Chief among these methodological confounds was the observation that mice display a stress response to the presence of nearby males of a number of mammalian species, including human male experimenters, calling into question the results of thousands of studies in the animal literature when the sex of the experimenter was not controlled, an animal equivalent to the "sweaty t-shirt study" in humans. This finding led to torrent of media activity, with articles on the finding in The New York Times, National Geographic, The Atlantic, The Economist, The New Yorker, Time, and U.S. News & World Report, among others, and radio appearances on NPR's Science Friday, BBC World Service's "Newsday" and CBC's "As It Happens".
