= Sellitto =

- Randall–Selitto test, a technique for the measurement of the pain response in animals
- Carlo Sellitto, an Italian painter of the Baroque period
- Giuseppe Sellitto, an Italian composer
