= Grimace scale =

Method of assessing pain in non-human animals

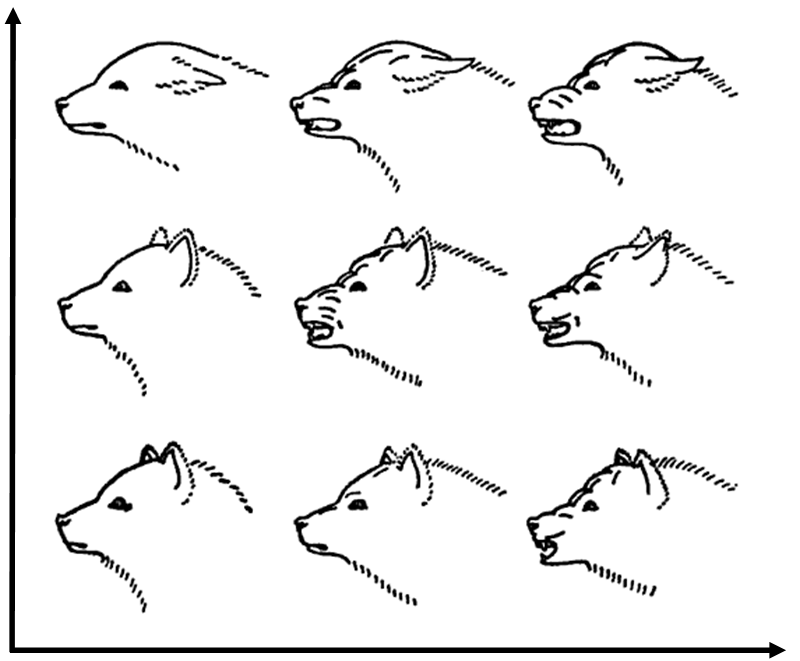
A drawing by Konrad Lorenz showing facial expressions of a dog

The grimace scale (GS), sometimes called the grimace score, is a method of assessing the occurrence or severity of pain experienced by non-human animals according to objective and blinded scoring of facial expressions, as is done routinely for the measurement of pain in non-verbal humans. Observers score the presence or prominence of "facial action units" (FAU), e.g. Orbital Tightening, Nose Bulge, Ear Position and Whisker Change. These are scored by observing the animal directly in real-time, or post hoc from photographs or screen-grabs from videos. The facial expression of the animals is sometimes referred to as the pain face.

The GS method of pain assessment is highly applicable to laboratory rodents as these are usually prey species which tend to inhibit the expression of pain to prevent appearing vulnerable to predators. For this reason, behavioural changes in these species are mainly observed with acute pain (hours) but are less pronounced in longer-lasting pain (days).

For mice at least, the GS has been shown to be a highly accurate, repeatable and reliable means of assessing pain requiring only a short period of training for the observer. Across species, GS are proven to have high accuracy and reliability, and are considered useful for indicating both procedural and postoperative pain, and for assessing the efficacy of analgesics.

The overall accuracy of GS is reported as 97% for mice, 84% for rabbits, 82% for rats and 73.3% for horses.

== History ==
Facial expressions have long been considered as indicators of emotion in both human and non-human animals. The biologist Charles Darwin considered that non-human animals exhibit similar facial expressions to emotional states as do humans. The assessment of changes in human anatomy during facial expressions were successfully translated from humans to non-human primates, such as the chimpanzee (ChimpFACS) and rhesus macaque (MaqFACS), but were not originally applied to assess pain in these species. In 2010, a team of researchers successfully developed the first method to assess pain using changes in facial expression in any non-human animal species. Broadly speaking, GS quantify spontaneous pain according to objective and blinded scoring of facial expressions, as is done routinely for the measurement of pain in non-verbal humans. Observers score the presence and extent of "facial action units" (FAU), e.g. Orbital Tightening, Nose Bulge, Ear Position and Whisker Change. These are scored in real-time by observing the animal directly, or, post hoc from photographs or screen-grabs from videos.

This method of pain assessment is highly applicable to prey animals which tend to inhibit the overt expression of pain to prevent appearing vulnerable to predators. For this reason, behavioural changes in these species are mainly observed with acute pain (hours) but are less pronounced in longer-lasting pain (days).

GS offer advantages over other methods of pain assessment. For example, the analgesic morphine reduces pain but can affect other aspects of behaviour in pain-free animals, for example, excitement, increased activity or sedation, which can hamper traditional behavioural assessment of its action on pain. Morphine not only reduces the frequency of "pain faces" but has no effect on GS in baseline, pain-free mice.

== In mice ==
The GS for mice usually consists of five FAU, i.e. Orbital Tightening, Nose Bulge, Cheek Bulge, Ear position and Whisker Change. These are scored on a 0-2 scale where 0=the criterion is absent, 1=moderately present and 2=obviously present. In mice, the GS offers a means of assessing post-operative pain that is as effective as manual behavioural-based scoring, without the limitations of such approaches.

Facial grimacing by mice after undergoing laparotomy surgery indicates postoperative pain lasts for 36 to 48 h (and at relatively high levels for 8 to 12 h) with relative exacerbation during the early dark (active) photo-phase. Furthermore, the grimacing indicates that buprenorphine is fully efficacious at recommended doses against early postoperative pain, but carprofen and ketoprofen are efficacious only at doses much higher than currently recommended: acetaminophen is not efficacious.

A study in 2014 examined postoperative pain in mice following surgical induction of myocardial infarction. The effectiveness of the GS at identifying pain was compared with a traditional welfare scoring system based on behavioural, clinical and procedure-specific criteria. It was reported that post hoc GS (but not real-time GS) indicated a significant proportion of the mice were in low-level pain at 24 h which were not identified as such by traditional assessment methods. Importantly, those mice identified as experiencing low-level pain responded to analgesic treatment, indicating the traditional methods of welfare assessment were insensitive in this aspect of pain recognition.

Mice with induced sickle cell disease and their controls exhibited a "pain face" when tested on a cold plate, but sickle mice showed increased intensity compared to controls; this was confirmed using Von Frey filaments a traditional method of pain assessment. GS have also been used to assess pain and methods of its alleviation in pancreatitis. GS have also been used to test the degree of pain caused as a side-effect of therapeutic drugs and methods of mitigating the pain.

The mouse GS has been shown to be a highly accurate, repeatable and reliable means of assessing pain, requiring only a short period of training for the observer. Assessment approaches that train deep neural networks to detect pain and no-pain images of mice may further speed up MGS scoring, with an accuracy of 94%.

=== Sex and strain effects ===
It has been noted that DBA/2 strain mice, but not CBA strain mice, show an increase in GS score following only isoflurane anaesthesia, which should be taken into account when using the GS to assess pain. Administration of a common analgesic, buprenorphine, had no effect on the GS of either strain.

There are interactions between the sex and strain of mice in their GS and also the method that is used to collect the data (i.e. real-time or post hoc), which indicates scorers need to consider these factors.

=== Effects of non-painful procedures ===
It is important to establish whether methods of pain assessment in laboratory animals are influenced by other factors, especially those which are a normal part of routine procedures or husbandry. There is no difference in GS scores between mice handled using a tube compared with mice picked up by the tail, indicating these handling techniques are not confounding factors in GS assessment. A similar study reported there was no difference between GS scores at baseline and immediately post ear notching (a method frequently used to identify laboratory mice), potentially indicating that the pain associated with ear notching is either too acute to assess using the GS tool or the practice is not painful.

== In rats ==
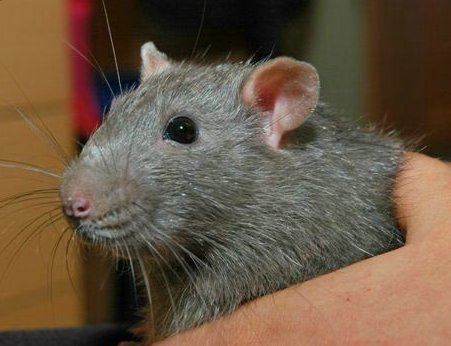
Closeup of the face of an agouti Russian blue rat

There are differences between the "pain face" of mice and rats. In mice, the nose and cheek at baseline have a smooth appearance, but in the presence of pain, change to distinct bulges in both the nose and cheek regions. By contrast, in rats at baseline, the nose and cheek regions show distinct bulging, and with pain, the bridge of the nose flattens and elongates, causing the whisker pads to flatten. As a consequence of these differences, the GS for rats sometimes use four FAU, i.e. Orbital Tightening, Nose/Cheek Flattening, Ear Changes and Whisker Changes. Nose/Cheek Flattening appears to show the highest correlation with the presence of pain in the rat.

GS for rats has been used to assess pain due to surgery, orthodontic tooth movement, osteoarthritis, acute chemotherapy-induced mucositis, and the efficacy of analgesics for these procedures and other painful conditions. Furthermore, GS have been used to examine the effects of postoperative analgesia on the reduction of post-operative cognitive dysfunction in aged rats.

As with mice, studies have examined the extent of agreement in assessing pain between rat GS and the use of von Frey filaments. Good agreement has been found between these in relation to three models of pain (intraplantar carrageenan, intraplantar complete Freund's adjuvant and plantar incision). The GS score significantly increased in all pain models and the peak GS score also coincided with the development of paw hypersensitivity, although hypersensitivity persisted after GS scores returned to baseline.

For rats, software (Rodent Face Finder) has been developed which successfully automates the most labour-intensive step in the process of quantifying the GS, i.e. frame-grabbing individual face-containing frames from digital video, which is hindered by animals not looking directly at the camera or poor images due to motion blurring.

== In rabbits ==
A GS for rabbits using four FAU, i.e. Orbital Tightening, Cheek Flattening, Nose Shape, Whisker Position (Ear Position is excluded from the analysis) has been developed (for exemplar images, see here ) and used to assess the effectiveness of an analgesic cream for rabbits having undergone ear-tattooing. Similarly, a GS has been used to evaluate wellness in the post-procedural monitoring of rabbits.

== In horses ==
Based on the identification of FAU in rodents and rabbits, a GS for horses has been developed from post-operative (castration) individuals. This is based on six FAU, i.e. Stiffly Backwards Ears, Orbital Tightening, Tension Above the Eye Area, Prominent Strained Chewing Muscles, Mouth Strained and Pronounced Chin, Strained Nostrils and Flattening of the Profile (for exemplar images, see here.) The HGS has thereafter been used to evaluate pain behavior in the laminitic horse, where it was concluded that the grimace scale can be used to assess the degree of pain also here, when compared to the Obel scale.

A related study describes the equine "pain face" after pain induction by a tourniquet on the antebrachium or topical capsaicin. The pain face here involves similar facial expressions described for the HGS; low and/or asymmetrical ears, an angled appearance of the eyes, a withdrawn and/or tense stare, medio-laterally dilated nostrils and tension of the lips, chin and certain mimetic muscles and can potentially be incorporated to improve existing pain evaluation tools. From the described pain face, The Equine Pain Scale has been developed. Another pain scale has been described (EQUUS-FAP) which also has proven to assess acute pain in horses in a significant way.

To map and explain the different facial expressions seen in the equine face during acute pain, an equine facial action coding system (EquiFACS) has been developed. Seventeen FAU have been identified and the involved anatomical structures behind each facial expression are explained and compared to facial expressions seen in other species.

== In cats ==
A preliminary study based on landmarks and distances between ears and in the muzzle demonstrated that observers shown facial images from painful and pain-free cats had difficulty in identifying pain-free from painful cats, with only 13% of observers being able to discriminate more than 80% of painful cats. Accuracy (based on a dichotomous judgement - pain or no pain) ranged from 18 to 94%.

A complete GS (Feline Grimace Scale - FGS) for cats was published in 2019 to detect naturally occurring acute pain. Five FAU were identified: ear position, orbital tightening, muzzle tension, whiskers change and head position. Each FAU receives a score from 0 to 2 and a total pain score is calculated as the sum of the FAU's scores divided by the total possible score excluding those AU marked as "not possible to score" (i.e. 4/10 = 0.4 or 4/8 = 0.5). A training manual is available as "Supplementary information" within the original article.

The FGS has been thoroughly validated and reported high discriminative ability, good overall inter-rater reliability, excellent intra-rater reliability, and excellent internal consistency. The FGS scores were higher in painful than in control cats; a very strong correlation with another validated instrument for pain assessment in cats was observed and the FGS detected response to analgesic treatment (scores after analgesia were lower than before). Additionally, an analgesic threshold was determined (total pain score >0.39 out of 1.0). The FGS is an easy and quick-to-use tool for acute pain assessment in cats.

The clinical applicability of the FGS in cats undergoing ovariohysterectomy has been explored by comparing the scores assigned in real-time by an experienced observer with those scores assigned to still images, and good agreement has been reported. The FGS is also a reliable tool for pain assessment in cats undergoing dental extractions and the caregiver's presence did not affect FGS scores.

== In sheep ==
A GS for sheep has been developed to detect pain caused by naturally occurring diseases such as footrot and mastitis. A GS has been used to assess pain due to the routine husbandry procedure of tail-docking in lambs. There was high reliability between and within the observers, and high accuracy. Restraint of the lambs during the tail-docking caused changes in facial expression, which needs to be taken into account in use of the GS.

== In ferrets ==
Facial musculature of ferrets and compared lateral photographs of ferret faces were studied before and after intraperitoneal telemetry probe implantation. The FAU orbital tightening, nose bulging, cheek bulging, ear changes and whisker retraction were identified as potential indicators of pain in ferrets. All AU-scores assigned to the photographs taken five hours after surgery were significantly higher compared to their time-matched baseline scores. Further analysis using weights that were obtained using a Linear Discriminant Analysis revealed that scoring orbital tightening alone was sufficient to make this distinction with high sensitivity, specificity and accuracy.

== See also ==
- Three Rs (animal research)
