= Nociception assay =

Test to measure pain

A nociception assay (nocioception or nocioperception assay) evaluates the ability of an animal, usually a rodent, to detect a noxious stimulus such as the feeling of pain, caused by stimulation of nociceptors. These assays measure the existence of pain through behaviors such as withdrawal, licking, immobility, and vocalization. The sensation of pain is not a unitary concept; therefore, a researcher must be conscious as to which nociception assay to use.

== Formalin ==
The formalin assay is the most popular chemical assay of nociception. It entails the injection of a dilute solution of formalin into the surface of the rodent's hindpaw, followed by the scoring of stereotypical behaviors such as flinching, licking, and biting of the affected hindpaw. The behaviors last for approximately 1 hour, with the early or acute stage (directly after injection) reflecting direct activation of nociceptors and the late or tonic phase (15 to 20 minutes after the injection) reflecting inflammation. Typically, the formalin assay is used on rats; however, formalin concentrations and scoring methods can be modified as to suit mice. One major advantage of the formalin assay over other models of inflammatory pain is the limited duration (approximately 1 hour) of the response. Additionally, as described before, this assay produces a response in two discrete stages, allowing researchers to model both acute and tonic pain using a single noxious chemical.

== Writhing ==
In the writhing test, the peripheral nociceptive activity of a test compound is determined by the number of abdominal writhes induced by the intraperitoneal injection of acetic acid.

== Von Frey ==
The Von Frey assay, introduced by Maximilian von Frey and modified by Weinstein, uses Von Frey hair or fibers, which are small pieces of nylon rod, approximately 50 mm in length, and of varying diameters, to test a rodent's sensitivity to a mechanical stimulus. It is unclear whether the process is really considered noxious versus simply annoying, so this assay is a test of mechanical nociception or simply mechanical sensibility. In this test, the animal stands on an elevated mesh platform, and the Von Frey hairs are inserted through the mesh to poke the animal’s hindpaw. Normal reactions for the animal include withdrawing or licking or shaking the paw, and possible vocalization, but these can depend on variability within the experiment. For example, the tarsal surface of the hind paw is typically associated with lower withdrawal thresholds compared to the dorsal surface, and the exact force of the fiber is determined by its thickness. It is also important to note that thresholds usually are initially decreasing during successive tests, but do become stable after about 3 sessions. Algorithms such as up-down or Bruceton analysis are available to concentrate testing into the most dynamic part of the range, and subsequent curve fitting and parameter estimation can be similarly standardised. Alternatively, automated von Frey systems have recently been discovered that gradually increase the force of a single probe so that a researcher can observe when withdrawal responses occur.

== Thermal assays ==
Sensitivity to acute thermal stimulation is the most common test used in live species pain research. The behavioral reflex evoked by noxious heat stimuli is a relatively good predictor of pain sensitivity and its reduction through various analgesics. One significant limitation of thermal assays lies in the specificity and validity of results in animals as models of human pain. Very little is known about the functional mechanics of nociceptive afferents in murine subjects, thus the translation of any pain response observed from these animals to humans is questionable.

=== Tail withdrawal ===
Two versions of the tail withdrawal assay are commonly employed in pain sensitivity testing. In the classic radiant heat test, a heat source is targeted onto a small area of the tail, and the latency to withdraw the tail away from the heat source is measured. In the tail-immersion test, a container of liquid is heated or cooled to a nociceptive temperature – normally 50–55 °C or below 0 °C. The animal subject is then placed with its tail immersed in the liquid, and the latency to withdraw the tail from the liquid is measured.

Animal subjects used must be restrained to a fairly high degree when performing the tail withdrawal test due to the exact positioning necessary to direct the noxious stimuli. Restraint is usually accomplished by placing the subjects in small Plexiglas tubes or cloth/cardboard pockets that the subjects can either be habituated to or voluntarily enter.

The primary advantage of tail withdrawal assays to other forms of thermal nociception testing, such as the hot-plate test or Hargreaves test, is the relative stability of results with repeated observations. Pain-reflex latency observations from other tests are usually much more variable both across and within subjects than those obtained from the tail withdrawal assay.

=== Hot plate ===
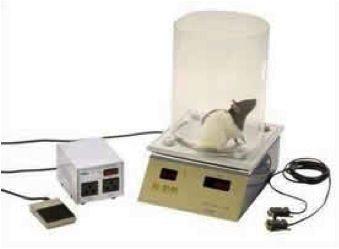
Example of a hot plate assay performed on a rat

A heat-conductive surface, such as porcelain or metal, is heated to a temperature that will induce a nociceptive response in an animal subject – normally 50–56 °C. The subject is then placed onto the surface and prevented from leaving the platform by blockades. The latency to pain-reflex behavior is measured. One complication of this assay is its unsuitability for repeated testing. Animals that have been subjected to the hot-plate test in the past display a behavioral tolerance phenomenon, which is characterized by decreased latencies and reduced sensitivities to antinociceptive agents. Another complication of the hot-plate test is determining what constitutes a behavioral pain response; is it the lifting/licking of paws, vocalization, attempting to climb out of the cylinder, etc. Also, delivering the heat stimulus in a controlled fashion presents difficulties due to each section having varying temperatures based upon surface area exposure and whether the animal is moving or not.

=== Tail flick ===
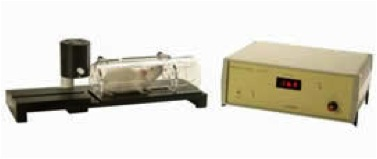
Example of a traditional set-up for the tail flick assay

The tail flick assay or tail flick test uses a high-intensity beam of light aimed at a rodent's tail to detect nociception. In normal rodents, the noxious heat sensation induced by the beam of light causes a prototypical movement of the tail via the flexor withdrawal reflex. An investigator normally measures the time it takes for the reflex to be induced, a factor influenced by a rodent's sex, age and body weight. The most critical parameter for the tail flick assay is the beam intensity; stimuli producing latencies of larger than 3–4 seconds generally create more variable results. Another important factor to consider is the level of restraint used; rodents held too tightly may exhibit greater tail flick latencies due to heightened stress levels.

== Hargreaves ==
The Hargreaves assay uses a high-intensity beam of light directed at the hindpaw rather than the tail to induce pain; an investigator then measures the time it takes for the animal to withdraw its hindpaw. In contrast to the tail flick assay, rodents are often unrestrained while the radiant heat source is focused on the hindpaw. Cut-off latency for the Hargreaves assay is commonly set at 10 seconds. The main advantage of this test over the tail flick assay is that it allows independent assessment of treatment effects on both sides of the body.

== Applications ==
One of the most common applications of nociception assays is to test the effectiveness of new pain medications and drugs of the like. One can then perform comparative tests to measure the differences in the effects of the drug on varying populations, such as men versus women, or young versus old. These tests can also identify certain harmful diseases or abnormalities in subjects if they display atypical nociception test responses. Additionally, nociception tests can be used to test the heritability of nociception itself. One can also use nociception assays to assess the physiology of the "pain" pathways. The role capsaicin receptors play in the pain pathways has been measured by comparing results from nociception assays in mice with and without the receptor. In addition, they are useful in other tests to make sure control subjects have normal nociception responses.

== See also ==
- Formaldehyde
- Nociceptor
- Withdrawal reflex
