= Josephine Semmes =

American neuroscientist (1916–1998)

- Born: November 2, 1916; Hazlehurst, MS, US
- Other names: Josephine Semmes Blum; Josephine Semmes Blum Evarts
- Education: Yale University
- Scientific career
- Thesis: Cortical Organization in Somesthesis (1949)

Josephine Semmes (1916–1998) was an American neuropsychologist. Semmes researched how touch and spatial orientation are processed in the brain and developed a pioneering hypothesis about differences between the right and left hemispheres. She also did early research demonstrating neuroplasticity in adult primates. In the course of her neuropsychological research, she co-developed a tactile sensitivity test, the Semmes-Weinstein monofilament test, which was later used by clinicians for tracking the course of diseases including leprosy and diabetic neuropathy.

== Early life and education ==
Semmes was born on November 2, 1916 in Hazlehurst, Mississippi. She received her Ph.D from Yale University in 1949.

== Career ==
=== Research at Yerkes ===
Semmes worked in the lab of Warren McCulloch and Walter Pitts in Chicago. Semmes also worked with Karl Lashley at the Yerkes Laboratory of Primate Biology (originally associated with Yale) in Orange Park, Florida. She was among the various postdocs and graduate students who participated with Lashley and Yale professor Karl Pribram in coming up with the name "neuropsychology" for their field of research: using behavioral techniques to investigate the organization of brain processes. Along with Robert A. Blum, Semmes carried out research with Pribram functionally characterizing the frontal lobes of chimpanzees, which they presented to a meeting of the American Psychological Association. Along with Kao-Liang Chow, Semmes carried out research with Pribram removing areas of the brain adjacent to but not part of the primary sensory cortex, showing that such damage could still disrupt sensory processing. Semmes also worked at the National Hospital for Neurology and Neurosurgery, Queen Square, London.

=== Research in Teuber lab ===
Semmes received a fellowship in psychology at New York University, where she joined the research group of Hans-Lukas Teuber. She continued working with him after he moved to Bellevue Medical Center in Boston. In 1952, Semmes was awarded a medical research fellowship, on the recommendation of the National Institute of Mental Health. She received $3,600 to study war veterans with penetrating head wounds for somatosensory capacity. The study found that the veterans lost their ability to learn a pattern through touch using the hand controlled by the injured, opposite, side of the brain.

==== Invention of the Semmes-Weinstein monofilaments ====
While Semmes was working at Bellevue Hospital, Sidney Weinstein, who was also working there on his doctoral research in neuroscience under Teuber, persuaded her that a two-point device for detecting touch sensitivity, which she had brought to the lab, could be improved. Together they carried out the long, involved procedure of calibrating nylon microfilaments using a chemical balance. They used these microfilaments to create a new tactile sensitivity test they called "the pressure test". The new testing device they made was a particular type of esthesiometer (a device for measuring tactile sensitivity), later known as the Semmes-Weinstein Aesthesiometer, which used these calibrated monofilaments. Like much of the other experimental apparatus in Teuber lab, the first Semmes-Weinstein Pressure Aesthesiometer was designed frugally: it was housed in a small cigar box labeled "El Paso Cigars, The Cowboy's Payday Smoke." Weinstein completed his dissertation in 1952. These Semmes-Weinstein monofilaments came into wide use for various applications, including testing for the sensitivity of hands and feet. In May 1992, Weinstein traveled to Carville, Louisiana, to the Laboratory Research Branch of the Gillis W. Long Hansen's Disease Center, to reminisce about the history of this invention. He received a plaque from the leprosy researchers there commemorating the "gift to the world" of the Semmes-Weinstein monofilaments. The Semmes-Weinstein monofilament test (sometimes known simply as "the monofilament test") had become a standard diagnostic technique for assessing neuronal function in leprosy patients.

==== Research on somatosensory processing ====
Semmes was the first author of a monograph, Somatosensory Changes After Penetrating Brain Wounds in Man, published by Teuber's group in 1960. It had previously been known that some lesions to the right hemisphere of the brain could cause changes in tactile sensitivity of the left hand, and vice versa. The authors had mapped the correspondence between exactly where in the brain the lesion occurred, and exactly where on the contralateral hand the change in sensitivity occurred. This mapping would indicate how an area of the hand was represented by a corresponding area of the brain responsible for processing touch sensation. The researchers had found that the touch processing region of the brain differed in each hemisphere, and the pattern of loss also differed on the two sides of the body. They concluded that the representation of the right hand in the left hemisphere was more "concentrated" than the representation of the left hand in the right hemisphere.

==== Research on spatial orientation ====
Semmes was also the first author on papers from the Teuber lab investigating spatial orientation. They found differences in the regions of the brain involved in orienting personal space (i.e., one's own body) versus extra-personal space.

When the Teuber group was still at NYU, visiting scientists would come and give talks during their Thursday lunch meetings. On one such occasion, Don Hebb came and continued a theoretical discussion on brain injury and intelligence from lunch all the way through to dinner with Weinstein, Semmes, and Ed Evarts. Other such visiting scientists included Harry Harlow, Joe Zubin, Dave Wechsler, and many more. Semmes, Weinstein, Lila Ghent, and Teuber worked together for several years as a close knit group, meticulously scrutinizing one another's research and writing.

=== Move to the National Institutes of Health ===
==== Early demonstration of neuroplasticity in adult primates ====
After leaving Bellevue Hospital, Semmes joined the Animal Behavior section at the National Institutes of Health in Bethesda, Maryland to study cortical functioning in monkeys. She collaborated with Mortimer Mishkin (whom she knew from Lashley's group), researching the neural mechanisms of inhibition, and training monkeys on tactile discrimination. In 1968 Semmes' publication presented her work demonstrating neuroplasticity in adult primates. She also supervised a couple of post-docs, including Ruth Nadel, and had a research assistant, John Sulu.

=== Hemispheric lateralization theory ===
Semmes was the first to clearly propose that the two hemispheres of the brain process information in distinctly different ways. Neuroscientist Don M. Tucker wrote:

Semmes's theory influenced many later theoretical efforts (including my own) to understand brain lateralization. It has proven to be a pioneering model for reasoning from mental capacity to brain tissue.

— Don M. Tucker, Mind From Body,

In Semmes's theory, specific areas of the left hemisphere were specialized for like elements, work that was later relevant enough to appear in textbooks on neuropsychology. (In one possible scheme, these areas would mostly be connected to other nearby regions in the left hemisphere.) On the other hand, areas in the right hemisphere were specialized for integrating unlike elements. (In the same scheme, there would be more longer-range connections among different regions in the right hemisphere.)

== Works ==
=== Book ===
- Semmes, Josephine; Weinstein, Sidney; Ghent, Lila; and Teuber, Hans-Lukas, Somatosensory Changes After Penetrating Brain Wounds in Man, Cambridge: Harvard University Press, 1960.

=== Book chapters ===
- Semmes, Josephine, "Manual Stereognosis After Brain Injury", in Bosma, James F., ed., Symposium on Oral Sensation and Perception, Springfield, Illinois: Charles C. Thomas, 1967.
- Semmes, Josephine, "Protopathic and epicritic sensation: A reappraisal", in Benton, Arthur L., ed., Brain & Behavior: Research in Clinical Neuropsychology, New York: Routledge, 1969. doi:10.4324/9781315082035
- Semmes, Josephine, "Somesthetic Effects of Damage to the Central Nervous System", in Iggo, Ainsley, ed., Handbook of Sensory Physiology: Somatosensory System, Berlin: Springer-Verlag, 1973, pp. 719–742. doi:10.1007/978-3-642-65438-1_19

=== Selected articles ===
- Lashley, K. S., Chow, K. L, and Semmes, Josephine, "An examination of the electrical field theory of cerebral integration", Psychological Review, 58(2), 1951, pp. 123–136. doi:10.1037/h0056603
- Semmes, Josephine, "Agnosia in animal and man", Psychological Review, 60(2), 1953, pp. 140–147, doi:10.1037/h0054137
- Semmes, Josephine; Weinstein, Sidney; Ghent, Lila; and Teuber, Hans-Lukas, "Correlates of Impaired Orientation in Personal and Extrapersonal Space", Brain, Volume 86, 1963, pp. 747–772. doi:10.1093/brain/86.4.747
- Semmes, Josephine, "A non-tactual factor in astereognosis", Neuropsychologia, Volume 3, Issue 4, November 1968, pp. 295–315. doi:10.1016/0028-3932(65)90004-7
- Semmes, Josephine, "Hemispheric specialization: A possible clue to mechanism", Neuropsychologia, Volume 6, Issue 1, March 1968, pp. 11–26. doi:10.1016/0028-3932(68)90035-3
- Deuel, Ruthmary K., Mishkin, Mortimer, and Semmes, Josephine, "Interaction between the hemispheres in unimanual somesthetic learning", Experimental Neurology, Volume 30, Issue 1, January 1971, pp. 123–138. doi:10.1016/0014-4886(71)90227-5

== Personal life ==
While Walter Pitts was a student at the University of Chicago from 1938 to 1943, Semmes (who had been divorced) was one of his closest personal friends. In 1945, Pitts considered proposing marriage to Semmes, and discussed the idea with his friend and colleague Warren McCulloch. However, Pitts abandoned the idea, and it is not clear whether he had ever directly communicated this type of interest to Semmes.

Semmes's friends called her "Jojie".

At some point Semmes was married to neuropsychologist Robert A. Blum. Some of her journal articles during this period referred to her as Josephine Semmes Blum or J. S. Blum. Subsequently, some time before December 30, 1952, Semmes married the neuroscientist Edward Evarts.
