= Tail flick test =

Pain response test

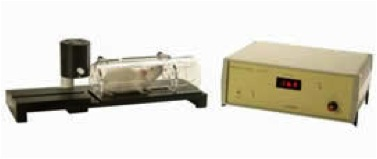
Tail flick test apparatus

The tail flick test is a test of the pain response in animals, similar to the hot plate test. It is used in basic pain research and to measure the effectiveness of analgesics, by observing the reaction to heat. It was first described by D'Amour and Smith in 1941.

== Procedure ==
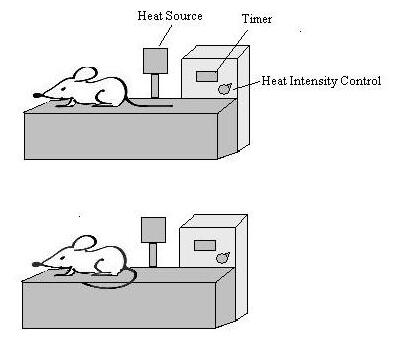
The experiment is set up with a heat source directed at the animal's tail (top); time is measured until the animal reacts by flicking its tail away (bottom).

Most commonly, an intense light beam is focused on the animal's tail and a timer starts. When the animal flicks its tail, the timer stops and the recorded time (latency) is a measure of the pain threshold. Alternate methods can be used to apply heat, such as immersion in hot water.

Alternately, a dolorimeter with a resistance wire with a constant heat flow may be used. For the tail flick test, the wire is attached to the tail of the organism, and the wire applies heat to the tail. The researcher then records the latency to tail flick.

== Applications ==
Researchers testing the effectiveness of drugs on the pain threshold often use the tail flick test to measure the extent to which the drug being tested has reduced the amount of pain felt by the model organism.

Both laboratory mice and rats are a common model organism for these tests. These rodents are usually given analgesics, which are responsible for weakening the response to pain. Under these weakened responses to pain, with effectiveness often peaking about 30 minutes after ingestion, researchers test the effectiveness of the drugs by exposing the tail to constant heat and measuring how long it takes to flick, signaling its response to the pain. Naloxone and naltrexone, two opioid antagonists, have been used to study pain sensitivity in relation to exercise in mice.

Experimental tests of the tail flick testing method showed that the temperature of the skin of the tail plays a major role in the critical temperature, i.e., the temperature at which the tail flicks in response to pain. Researchers found that if the tail has been exposed to a cooler temperature before the test, then the critical temperature decreases.

Through use of the tail flick test, researchers have found that genetics play a role in pain sensation and the effectiveness of analgesics. A mouse of one genetic line may be more or less tolerant of pain than a mouse of another genetic line. Also, a mouse of one genetic line may experience a higher or lower effectiveness of an analgesic than a mouse of another genetic line. Using this test, researchers can also begin to identify genes that play a role in pain sensation. For example, the Calca gene (see WikiGenes CALCA) is primarily responsible for the variability in thermal (heat) nociception. The Sprawling mutation (see WikiGenes Swl) resulted in moderate sensory neuropathy but did not alter nociceptive modality or motor function in the mice. The mice with the Sprawling mutation were unable to sense the pain, but their other sensory functions were unaffected.

== Limitations ==
The tail flick test is one test to measure heat-induced pain in animals. This reflexive response is an indicator of pain sensitivity in an organism and reduction of pain sensitivity produced by analgesics. Limitations of this test include: the need for more research with murine subjects, and determining the validity of applying observed pain responses from animals to humans. Also, researchers have found that skin temperature can significantly affect the results of the tail flick test and it is important to consider this effect when performing the test. Lastly, many thermal tests do not distinguish between opioid agonists and mixed agonist-antagonists, and consequently a tail flick test for mice using cold water in place of heat has been developed to allow that distinction.
