= Dolorimeter =

Instrument used to measure pain threshold and tolerance

- Purpose: measure pain threshold of an individual

A dolorimeter is an instrument used to measure pain threshold and pain tolerance. Dolorimetry has been defined as "the measurement of pain sensitivity or pain intensity". Dolorimeters apply steady pressure, heat, or electrical stimulation to some area, or move a joint or other body part and determine what level of heat or pressure or electric current or amount of movement produces a sensation of pain. Sometimes the pressure is applied using a blunt object.

== History ==
In 1940, James D. Hardy, Harold G. Wolff and Helen Goodell of Cornell University introduced the first dolorimeter as a method for evaluating the effectiveness of analgesic medications. They did their work at New York Hospital. They focused the light of a 100 watt projection lamp with a lens on an area of skin that had been blackened to minimize reflection. They found that most people expressed a pain sensation when the skin temperature reached 113 °F (45 °C). They also found that after the skin temperature reached 152 °F (67 °C), the pain sensations did not intensify even if the heat were increased. They developed a pain scale, called the "Hardy-Wolff-Goodell" scale, with 10 gradations, or 10 levels. They assigned the name of "dols" to these levels. Other researchers were not able to reproduce the results of Hardy, Wolff and Goodell, and the device and the approach were abandoned. Harvard Medical School Professor and Massachusetts General Hospital anaesthetist Henry K. Beecher (1957) expressed skepticism about this method of measuring pain. In 1945, Time reported that Cleveland's Lorand Julius Bela Gluzek had developed a dolorimeter that measured pain in grams. Gluzek stated that his dolorimeter was 97% accurate.

== Palpometer ==
A dolorimeter known as the Sonic Palpometer was developed at the University of Victoria in British Columbia, Canada. Patents have been applied for worldwide. The Sonic Palpometer uses ultrasound and computer technology to automate the physician's technique of palpation to determine sensitivity of some part of the patient's body.

The related pressure controlled palpometer (PCP) uses a pressure-sensitive piece of plastic film to determine how much pressure is being applied in palpation. This technique appears to be more reliable than unaided palpation.

== Algorimeter and other methods ==
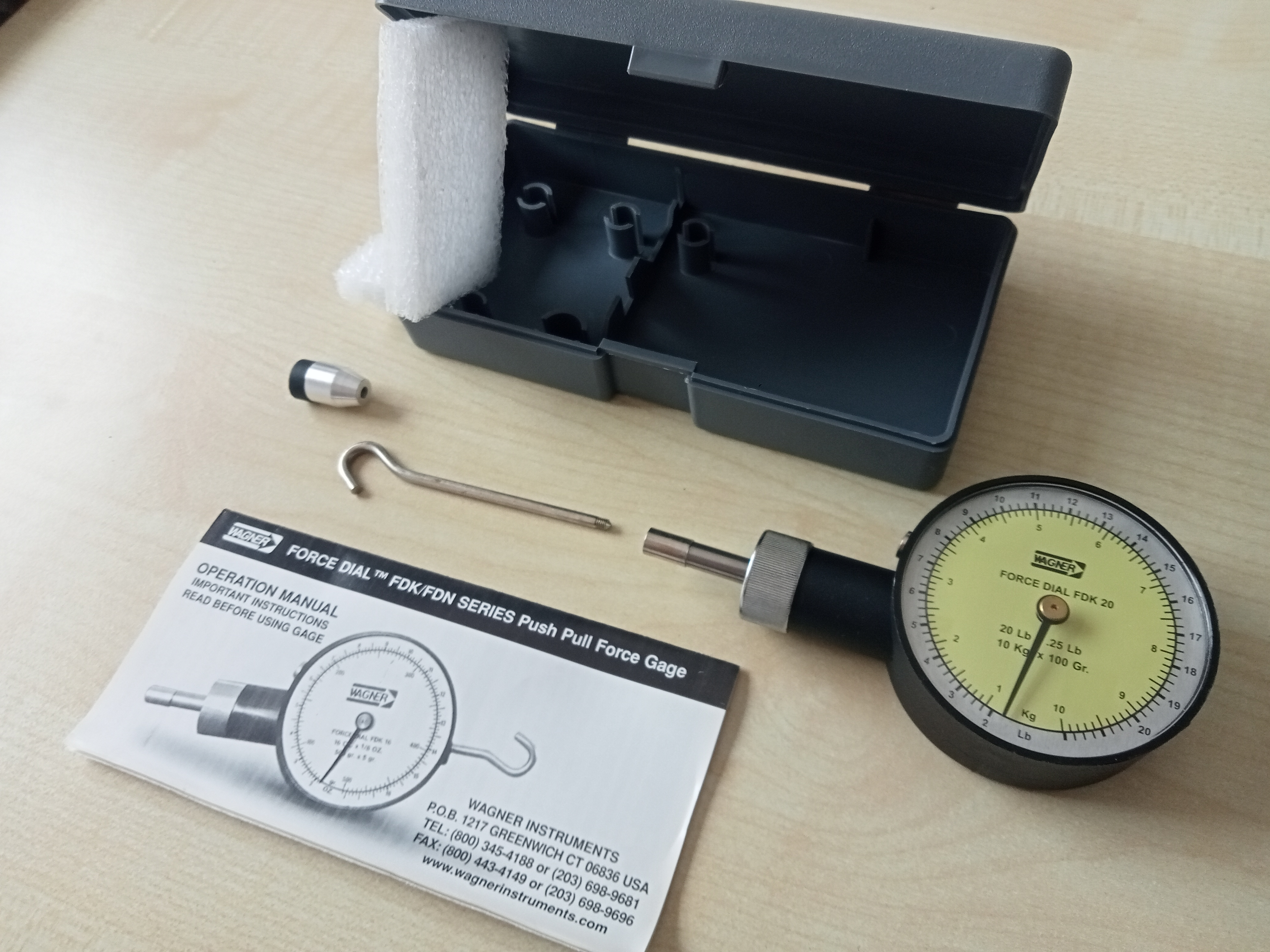
FDK 20 Wagner algometer

=== Techniques using lasers ===
Svensson et al. (1997) describe the use of a CO_{2} laser or a contact thermode to heat the skin and elicit a pain response.

A laser-based dolorimeter called a Dolorimeter Analgesia meter is marketed by IITC Life Sciences.

=== Techniques using heat lamps ===
Another pain measurement device uses heat from a 500 watt incandescent heat lamp which is delivered to a small area of skin.

=== Other dolorimeters ===
- Björnström's algesimeter measures sensitivity of the skin to pain.
- Boas' algesimeter measures sensitivity over the epigastrium.
- The AlgiScan, used for measuring the analgesia level in patients during anesthesia, quantifies within seconds the reflex papillary dilatation through an integrated nociceptive stimulator.

Other terms for similar instruments include algesiometer, algesichronometer (which also takes time into consideration), analgesia meter, algometer, algonometer, prick-algesimeter, pressure-algometer.

== Dolorimetry for animals ==
Dolorimetry in animals involves application of pain to various body parts. It is occasionally used as a diagnostic tool, and routinely used in basic pain research and in the testing of analgetics.

=== Tail ===
- Tail-withdrawal tests
- Tail-pinch tests
- Tail flick test

=== Paw ===
- Randall-Selitto test (paw pressure test)
- Hot plate test

== See also ==
- Dol
- Pain scale
- Pain threshold
- Pain tolerance
- Schmidt sting pain index
