= Edward Evarts =

American neuroscientist (1926–1985)

- Born: Edward Vaughan Evart; March 28, 1926; New York City, U.S.
- Died: July 2, 1985 (aged 59); Bethesda Maryland U.S.
- Education: Harvard College; Harvard Medical School
- Scientific career
- Fields: neuroscience

Edward Vaughan Evarts (March 28, 1926 – July 2, 1985) was an American neuroscientist. He pioneered single-unit recordings from the brains of awake, behaving monkeys.

== Life ==
Evarts was born in New York City in 1926 to Yachdiel (Edward Mark) Evarts and Mary Bowen Porter Evarts. His father was born to Russian parents who had immigrated to the US from Germany in 1890, when Edward Mark Evarts was one year old. Edward Vaughan Evarts received his undergraduate degree at Harvard College and a M.D. degree from Harvard Medical School in 1948. Evarts undertook an internship at Boston's Peter Bent Brigham Hospital. He worked with Karl Lashley at Yerkes Laboratories of Primate Biology in Orange Park, Florida beginning in 1949. Evarts married Josephine Semmes, a neuropsychologist. Evarts also worked at the National Hospital for Nervous Diseases in London. After a residency in psychiatry at the Payne Whitney Institute in New York, Evarts joined the National Institute of Mental Health in Bethesda, Maryland in 1953. He had initially been turned down by the Public Health Service because of a heart murmur, but Robert Felix and Robert Cohen had arranged a waiver for him. Evarts was appointed as head of the Section on Physiology at the Laboratory of Clinical Science of the NIMH and became chief of the Laboratory of Neurophysiology in 1970. Evarts remained in that position until he died, of a heart attack, in his laboratory, July 2, 1985.

Evarts started his neurophysiological research by conducting ablation studies of visual and auditory cortex in monkeys. He also studied effects of LSD and post-tetanic potentiation in the cat visual system. Evarts made his most significant contribution to the field of neuroscience and motor control by pioneering electrophysiological recordings from single cortical neurons in awake monkeys. In his early studies using this technique, he compared sleep and waking states. He then conducted experiments that involved single-unit recordings from sensorimotor cortex in monkeys performing operantly conditioned movements. He observed modulations in the activity of single neurons that reflected movement parameters.

Based on these observations, he developed the concepts of "motor set" and "transcortical reflex". "Psychomotor set" describes neural activity that occurs when a motor action in response to a stimulus ("go-cue") is being prepared. "Transcortical reflex" describes the operation of motor cortex in the way similar to spinal reflexes that influence spinal motoneuron firing.

=== Family ===
On September 12th, 1971, Ritva Poukka Evarts of Finland came to the NIH as a visiting scientist. Edward Vaughan Evarts was survived by his wife, Ritva, his son, Edward, and his two daughters, Joan and Lucy, as well as his sister Elizabeth Burr.

== Influence ==
The work of Evarts gave rise to a new field in neuroscience. His followers use single electrodes and electrode arrays temporarily inserted or implanted in the brain to record brain signals during different types of behavioral and cognitive activity and thereby gain knowledge about how the brain works. The knowledge accumulated in this research recently resulted in creation of brain-computer interfaces—electronic devices that sample neuronal activity in the brain, decode its meaning and use decoded information to operate external devices, such as robots.

== Prediction in 1956 concerning antipsychotic drugs and life expectancy ==
At a meeting in 1956 of the National Academy of Sciences, Evarts contended that antipsychotics such as the then new chlorpromazine would cause short-term benefits to patients, but at the cost of reducing life expectancy.
