= Hot plate test =

Pain response test

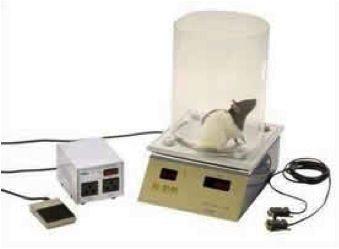
Example of a hot plate test performed on a rat

The hot plate test is a test of the pain response in animals, similar to the tail flick test. Both hot plate and tail-flick methods are used generally for centrally acting analgesics, while peripherally acting drugs are ineffective in these tests but sensitive to acetic acid-induced writhing test.

The hot plate test is used in basic pain research and in testing the effectiveness of analgesics by observing the reaction to pain caused by heat. It was proposed by Eddy and Leimbach in 1953. They used a behavioral model of nociception where behaviors such as jumping and hind paw-licking are elicited following a noxious thermal stimulus. Licking is a rapid response to painful thermal stimuli that is a direct indicator of nociceptive threshold. Jumping represents a more elaborated response, with a latency, and encompasses an emotional component of escaping.

== Procedure ==
- A transparent glass cylinder is used to keep the animal on the heated surface of the plate.
- The temperature of the hot plate is set using a thermoregulated water-circulated pump.
- The time of latency is defined as the time period between the zero point, when the animal is placed on the hot plate surface, and the time when the animal licks its paw or jumps off to avoid thermal pain.

== Research findings ==
=== Sex studies using antidepressants ===
Significant differences in pain sensitivity in male and female mice have been observed in laboratory studies. The SSRI antidepressant paroxetine did not display a gender difference in antinociceptive effects in mice.

==== Ion channels ====
Voltage-gated ion channels are implicated in pain sensation and transmission signaling mechanisms within both peripheral nociceptors and the spinal cord. Specific ion channel isoforms such as Nav1.7 and Nav1.8 sodium channels and Cav3.2 T-type calcium channels have distinct pro-nociceptive roles.

==== Opioid receptors ====
Activation of the μ-opioid receptor (MOR) and norepinephrine reuptake inhibition (NRI) are mechanisms of acute and chronic pain. OPRM1 knockout mice were used to determine the relative contribution of MOR activation to tapentadol and morphine induced analgesia. Wild-type mice exhibited an antinociceptive effect ten times that of OPM1 knockouts. However, the OPRM1 knockouts still exhibited a slight analgesic effect to tapentadol but not to morphine. This indicated that the antinociceptive effect of tapentadol is based on a combined mechanism of action involving both MOR and NRI.

==== Benzodiazepines and GABA receptors ====
Diazepam is a GABAA receptor benzodiazepine ligand that is an anxiety modulator. Studies using diazepam with the hot plate test showed that diazepam modified the behavioral structure of the pain response not from pain modulation but rather by reducing anxiety levels.

== Ethics ==
The Ethical Committee of the International Association for the Study of Pain has developed guidelines for the ethical use of this procedure. In the United States, such experiments must be approved by an Institutional Animal Care and Use Committee.
