= Maximilian von Frey =

- Born: 16 November 1852; Salzburg, Austrian Empire
- Died: 25 January 1932 (aged 79)
- Education: University of Leipzig
- Scientific career
- Fields: physiology
- Workplaces: Würzburg; Zurich

Maximilian (Max) Ruppert Franz von Frey (16 November 1852 – 25 January 1932) was an Austrian-German physiologist who was born in Salzburg.

He received his doctorate from the University of Leipzig in 1877, and subsequently worked at Carl Ludwig's Physiological Institute in Leipzig. Later he was a professor of physiology at the Universities of Würzburg and Zurich.

Frey's primary work in Leipzig dealt with the circulatory system, and he is credited with developing an early prototype of a heart-lung machine. He is remembered for his work involving cutaneous sensory mechanoreceptors. During the 1890s, Frey proposed that pain is an independent tactile quality, alongside touch, heat and cold, and that it is associated with stimulation of high-threshold free nerve endings. He described the skin as a mosaic of discrete spots, each sensitive to one or another of these stimuli. He created a unique type of esthesiometer, now referred to as a von Frey hair, which consisted of various calibrated monofilaments. These filaments can be used to determine the threshold force required to produce the sensation of touch or pain.
