= Esthesiometer =

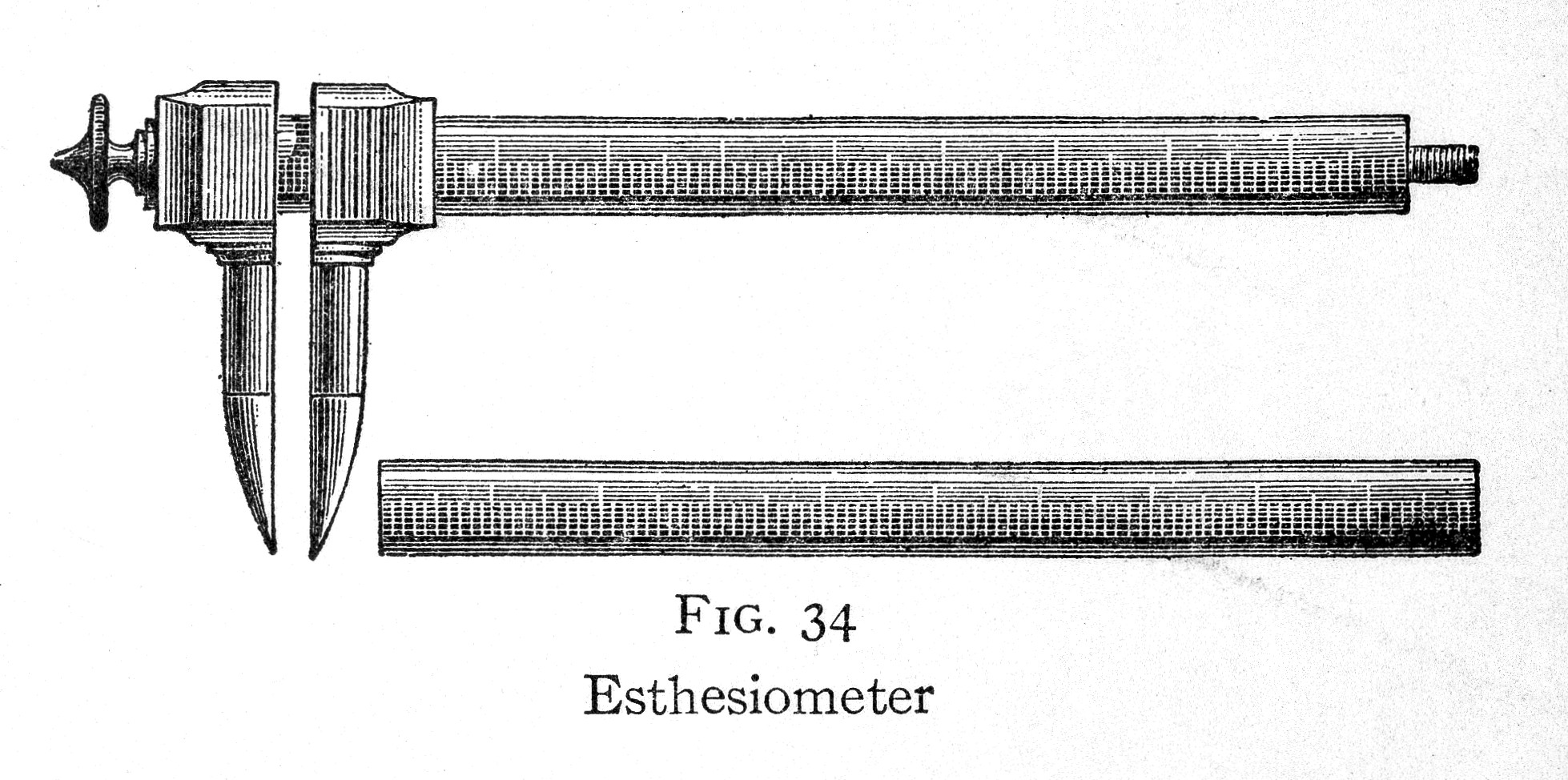
Esthesiometer from C. Lombroso's Criminal man

An esthesiometer (British spelling aesthesiometer) is a device for measuring the tactile sensitivity of the skin (or mouth, or eye, etc.). The measure of the degree of tactile sensitivity is called aesthesiometry. The device was invented by Edward Henry Sieveking. There are different types of aesthesiometers depending on their particular function.

== Two-point discrimination ==
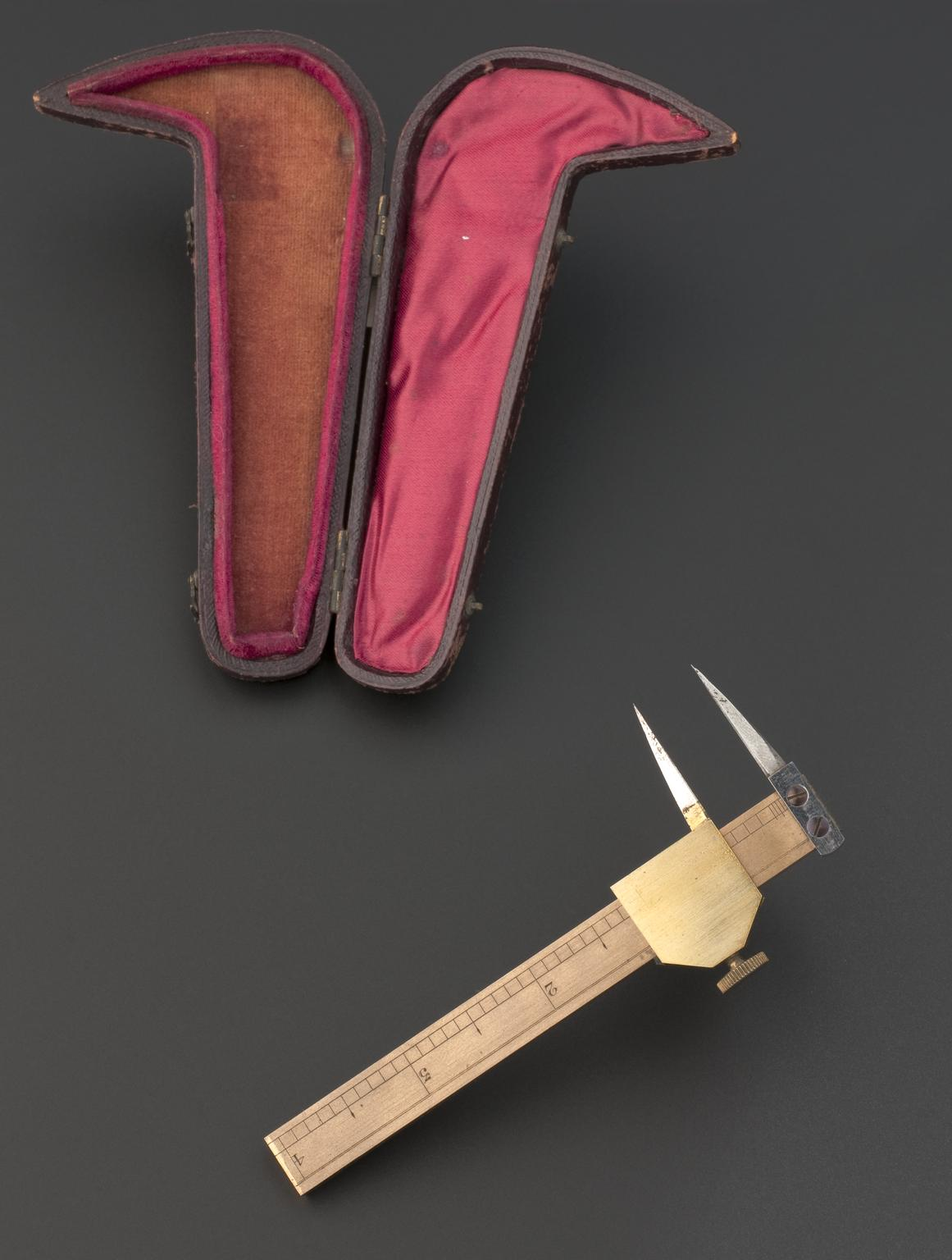
Esthesiometer and its case in the collection of the Science Museum, London, 19th century, by Becker of London

The simplest is a manual tool with adjustable points similar to a caliper. It can determine how short a distance between two impressions on the skin can be distinguished. To differentiate between two points and one point of equal area (the sum of the areas of the two points equals the area of the third point), Dr. Sidney Weinstein created the three-point esthesiometer. A scale on the instrument gives readings in millimeter gradients.

== Monofilaments ==
Another type of manual aesthesiometer is used to test lower thresholds of touch or pain. The tool uses nylon monofilaments with varying calibrated diameters. The force needed to cause the monofilament to buckle determines the tactile reading. The filaments are calibrated by force applied, rather than by gram/mm^{2} pressure ratings, because sensation follows force (when the stimulated area is small).

=== Von Frey hair ===
A von Frey hair is a type of aesthesiometer designed in 1896 by Maximilian von Frey. Von Frey filaments rely on the principle that an elastic column, in compression, will buckle elastically at a specific force, dependent on the length, diameter and modulus of the material. Once buckled, the force imparted by the column is fairly constant, irrespective of the degree of buckling. The filaments may therefore be used to provide a range of forces to the skin of a test subject, in order to find the force at which the subject reacts because the sensation is painful. This type of test is called a mechanical nociceptive threshold test.

The buckling force is inversely proportional to the length of the column (so the shorter the column, the higher the force required to buckle it) and proportional to the cube of the diameter, so that increasing the diameter of a filament by a small amount increases the buckling force considerably. Sets of filaments are normally made of nylon hairs, all the same length, but of various diameters so as to provide a range of forces, typically from 0.008 grams force up to 300 grams force. Von Frey filaments are a diagnostic, research, and screening tool, used both in human and animal medicine. They are readily used to study skin areas with normal responsiveness, as well as hyper- or hyposensitive areas.

The determination of a mechanical threshold using von Frey filaments requires a number of discrete tests using filaments with different bucking forces. There are two commonly used algorithms, the up-down method and the percent response method. The up-down method is most commonly used, usually requiring a minimum of four tests after the first response is detected. The first measurement should be made with a filament with a buckling force close to the expected mean of the population. Errors may result if testing is commenced a long way above or below the mean. These errors have been evaluated by a combination of experimentation and mathematical simulation.

=== Semmes-Weinstein Aesthesiometer ===
The Semmes-Weinstein Aesthesiometer, developed by Josephine Semmes and Sidney Weinsten, and its variant the Weinstein Enhanced Sensory Test (WEST, e.g., WEST-hand), present nylon monofilaments of approximately the same length (38 mm) and of varying diameters. The diameter and length are used to control the force applied. Whereas Sidney Weinstein used 3-digit numbers to reflect the force of the Semmes-Weinsein Aesthesiometer (3 digit number equals the common log of the force measured in tenths of a milligram), the WEST esthesiometers (also created by Weinstein and group) use grams (e.g., 0.70 g) to describe the force.

For small-area stimulating instruments like WEST, force, rather than area, is the appropriate measure. This is because an approximately equal area of skin is indented for the heavy and light forces (see Weinstein et al., Evaluation of sensory methods in neuropathy, in Tendon and Nerve Surgery in the Hand—a Third Decade, by Hunter et al.).

The area of stimulation of the Semmes-Weinstein Aestheiometer is not correctly described by the area of the stimulating nylon (the nylon twists on the skin, pushing a sharp edge into the skin). Therefore, the unit gram/mm2 is descriptive of the geometry but not the function. The WEST esthesiometer has a bulb for a contacting tip, so when the tip bends it presents the same contacting face.

== Air-based devices ==
A non-intrusive device called a corneal aesthesiometer is used to test cornea nerve sensitivity by using a controlled pulse of air as stimulation. The device gives readouts in millibars. Also, a thermal aesthesiometer is used to determine sensitivity of thermal stimuli.

Weinstein and group created an air-based corneal esthesiometer using gram-force (tens of micrograms force). They also created an air-based oral esthesiometer. For example, smokers' upper throats are much less sensitive than nonsmokers.
