= Randall–Selitto test =

Technique for measuring pain response in animals

The Randall–Selitto test or paw pressure test is a technique for the measurement of the pain response in animals. It is used in basic pain research and to test the effectiveness of analgetics by observing the reaction to gradually increasing pressure on an inflamed paw. Pain is deemed to be present if the animal starts to exhibit the flight or struggle response.

Randall and Selitto exploited the fact that inflammation increases pain sensitivity and this sensitivity is modifiable by analgesics. The inflammation may be induced by injecting a dry yeast suspension into the underside of the hind limb.
